= Sidr =

Sidr or SIDR may refer to:

- Cyclone Sidr, a very severe cyclonic storm in the Bay of Bengal in 2007
- As Sidr, Saudi Arabia, a village
- Sidra, Libya, a port city
- Ziziphus lotus, a small tree
- Ziziphus zizyphus (jujube), a small tree
- Secure Inter-Domain Routing, in computer networking
- SIDR (Standard Inside Dimension Ratio), a dimensional specification factor for IPS (Iron pipe size) polyethylene pipe

== See also ==
- Siðr, an Old Norse term for customs or mores
- Sidre, an early word for cider
- The Sidrat al-Muntaha, a sidr tree mentioned in the Quran
