= Preferred metric sizes =

Metricated industry standards

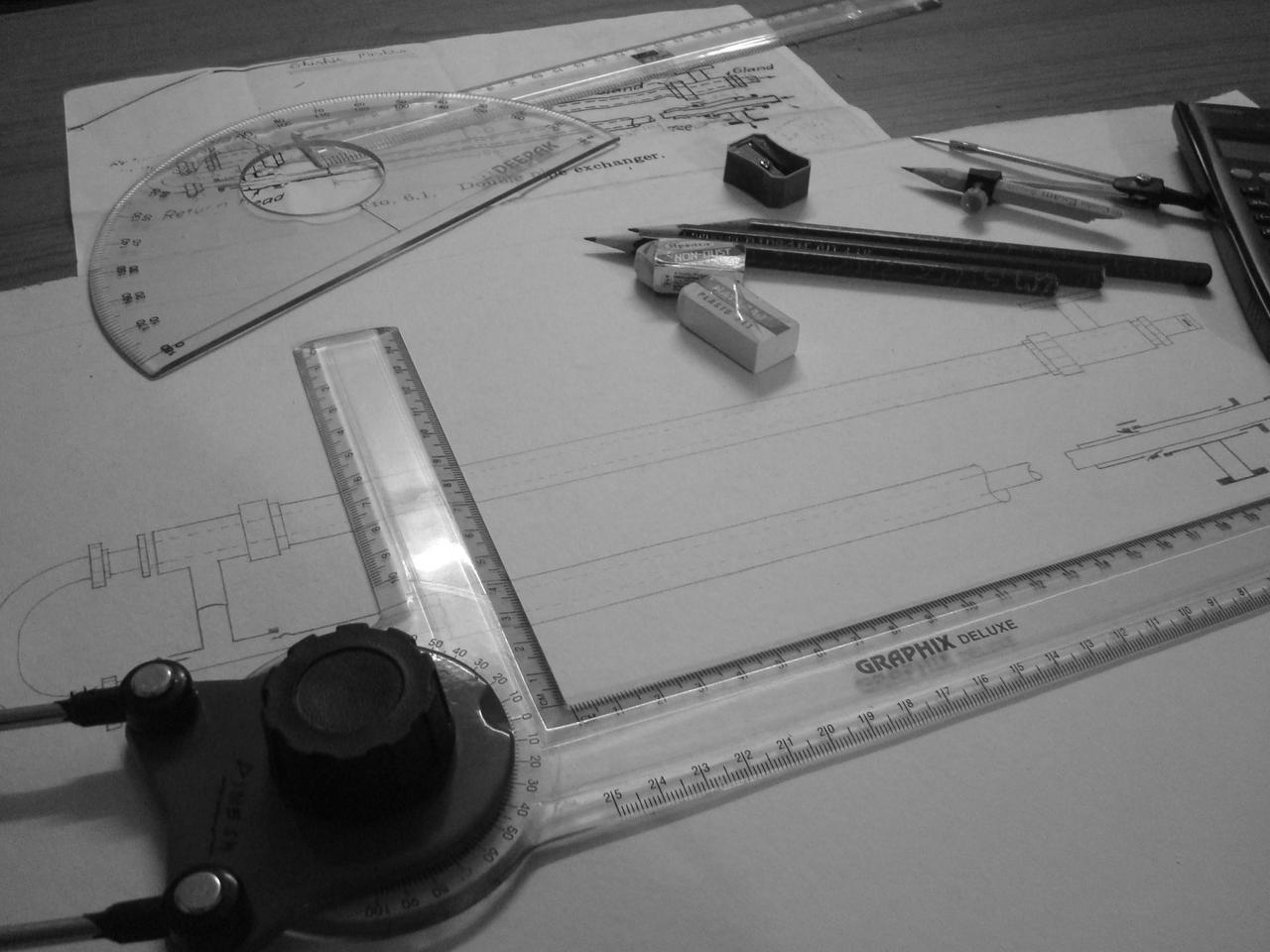
Use of preferred metric sizes is common in engineering designs

Preferred metric sizes are a set of international standards and de facto standards that are designed to make using the metric system easier and simpler, especially in engineering and construction practices. One of the methods used to arrive at these preferred sizes is the use of preferred numbers and convenient numbers, such as the Renard series and 1-2-5 series, to limit the number of different sizes of components needed.

One of the largest benefits of such limits is an ensuing multiplicative or exponential reduction in the number of parts, tools and other items needed to support the installation and maintenance of the items built using these techniques. This occurs because eliminating one diameter fastener will typically allow the elimination of a large number of variations on that diameter (multiple thread pitches, multiple lengths, multiple tip types, multiple head types, multiple drive types, and the tools needed for installing each, including multiple drill bits (one for each different thread pitch, material, and fit combination).

== Food and beverages ==
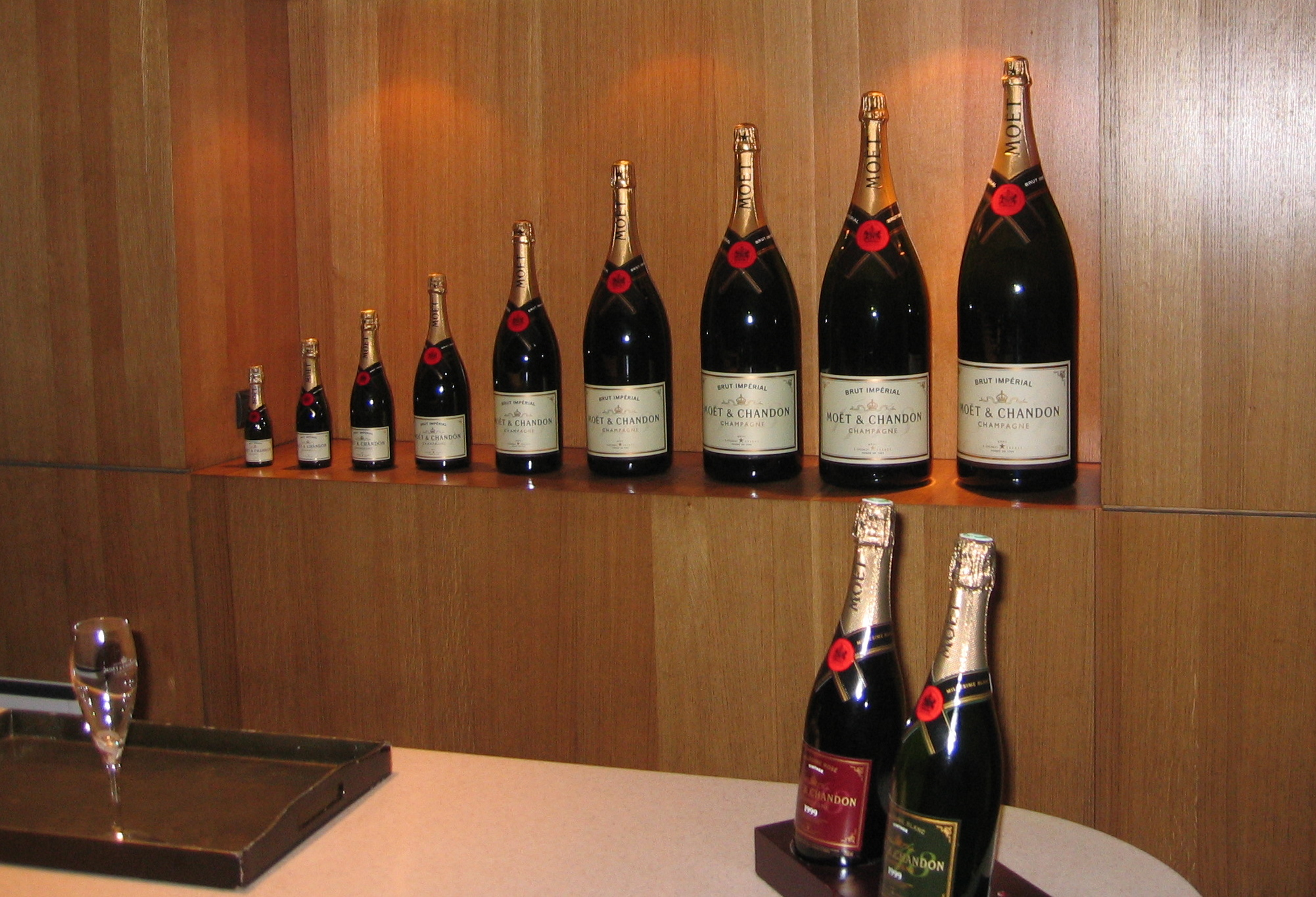
Champagne bottles in various sizes, probably 200 ml, 375 ml, 750 ml, 1.5 L, 3 L, 6 L, 9 L, 12 L and 18 L.

=== Liquor bottle sizes ===
International agreements, including 75/106/EEC, specify the capacities of liquor bottles allowed in international commerce as the following 10 sizes:

- 100 ml (1/10 L)
- 250 ml (1/4 L)
- 375 ml (3/8 L)
- 500 ml (1/2 L)
- 750 ml (3/4 L)
- 1 L
- 1.5 L
- 2 L
- 3 L
- 5 L

In the United States, the alcohol industry switched to metric bottle sizes on October 1, 1976, abandoning the existing 38 sizes of bottles and instead adopting the following 6 sizes:

- 50 mL (miniature)
- 200 mL (replaced the half-pint) (≈237 mL is a U.S. half-pint)
- 500 mL (replaced the pint) (≈473 mL is a U.S. pint)
- 750 mL (replaced the fifth) (≈757 mL is a fifth of a U.S. gallon)
- 1000 mL (replaced the quart) (≈946 mL is a U.S. quart)
- 1750 mL (replaced the half-gallon) (≈1893 mL is a half U.S. gallon)

== Building construction ==
=== System 32 furniture ===
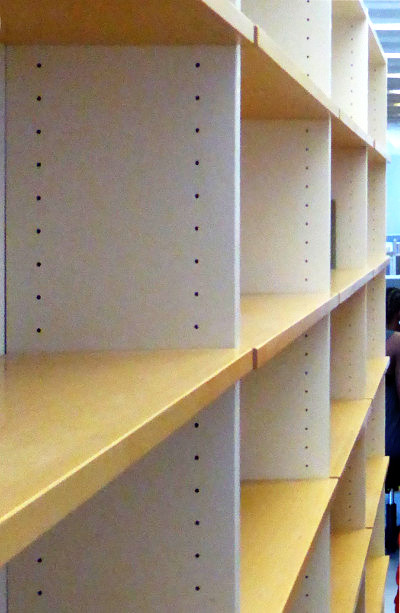
Shelf where the shelf bearing holes are placed with 32 mm distances from center to center, giving flexible choices for shelve positioning.

System 32 is a standard for the design and manufacture of furniture, most commonly used in the design of cabinets, wherein the major parts (sides, doors, etc.) are available in increments of 32 mm, and shelf supports consist of columns of 5 mm holes on 32 mm centers.

=== ISO 2848 basic module ===
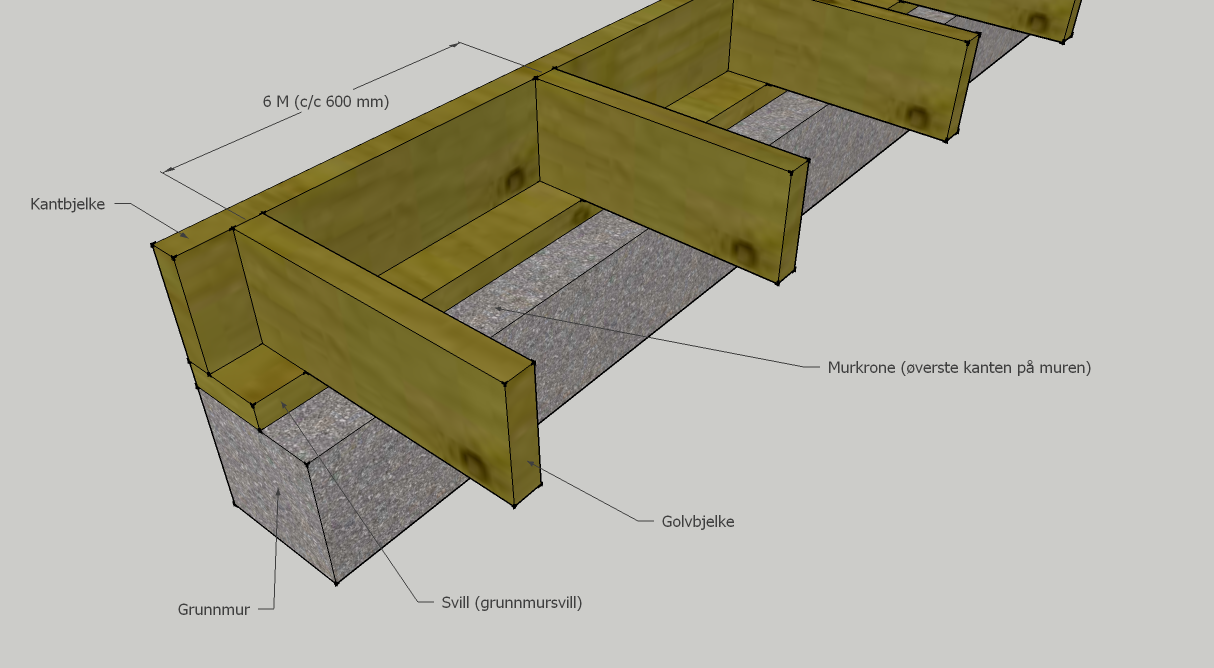
Cross section of a wooden joist layer, where 6 M (or 6 modules) indicates a distance of 600 mm.

The ISO 2848 basic module is a unit of 100 mm, often represented by a single capital "M", along with 300 mm and 600 mm groupings, that is widely used for the widths of furniture in Europe.

- A standard metric (concrete) block is 190 mm wide, 390 mm long, and 190 mm high, which allows for 10 mm mortar joints in between bricks, giving a standard unit size of 200 mm square by 400 mm long.
- A standard metric brick is 90 by 57 by 190 mm; with 10 mm of mortar, that produces a standard unit of 100 mm x 200 mm.

== Office equipment and supplies ==
A-series paper sizes.

=== ISO 216 paper sizes ===
ISO 216 standard specifies the A sizes of paper, including the very common A4, wherein the base size of A0 is one square meter, and the ratio between the height and width is $\sqrt{2}$, which results in all sizes of paper having the same aspect ratio.

Also related is the set of pen thicknesses for technical drawings (0.13, 0.18, 0.25, 0.35, 0.50, 0.70, 1.00, 1.40, and 2.00 mm).

== Manufacturing ==
=== ISO 261 and 262 fastener diameters ===
ISO 261 defines a set of preferred metric machine screw/bolt sizes, and ISO 262 defines a subset of those; both are based roughly on Renard series as defined in ISO 3, ISO 17, and ISO 497. Given that even ISO 262 specifies a fairly large set of diameters, a much simplified set of preferred diameters was developed by one of the lead designers of ASME Z17.1 and ANSI B4.2, Knut O. Kverneland, to reduce the list to 6 preferred sizes, and another 6 intermediate supplementary sizes.

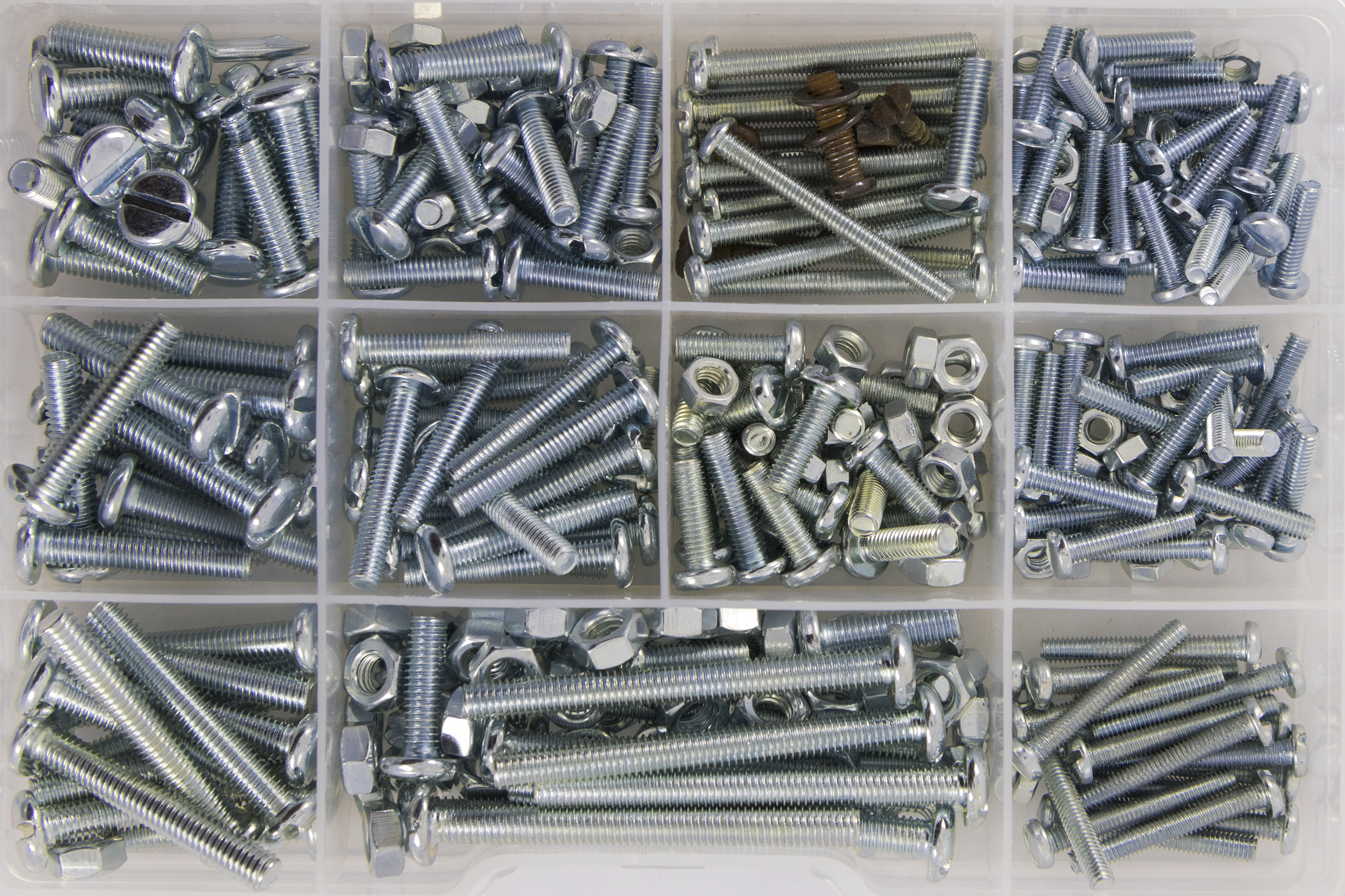
Machine screws with different thread diameters

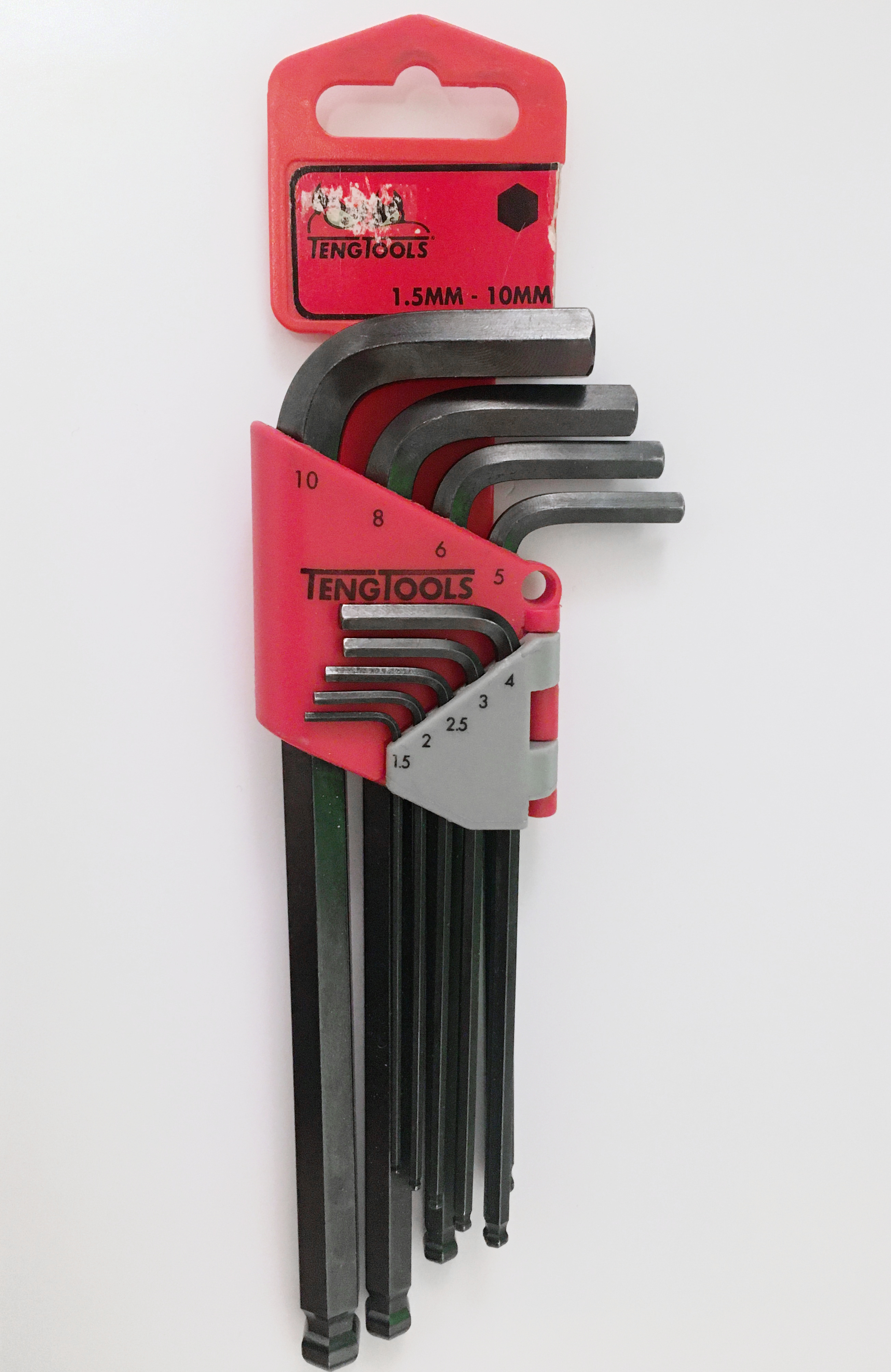
Hex key set with metric sizes from 1.5 mm to 10 mm according to sizes for use with ISO 262 screw sizes (except 3.5 mm for M6 internal set screw)

For each size bolt or screw and type of head, there is a corresponding size driver prescribed by various ISO standards, including:

- Internal hex drive: ISO 2936:2014 "Assembly tools for screws and nuts—Hexagon socket screw keys"
- External hex drive: ISO 4014, 4016, 4017, and 4018

Sizes in mm
ISO 262 sizes	Internal hex cap head	Internal hex button head	Internal hex flat head screws	Internal hex set screws	External hex ISO standard	External hex DIN standard
M2.5	2.0			2.0	5	5
M3	2.5	2.0	2.0	2.0	5.5	5.5
M4	3.0	2.5	2.5	2.5	7	7
M5	4.0	3.0	3.0	3.0	8	8
M6	5.0	4.0	4.0	3.5	10	10
M8	6.0	5.0	5.0	5.0	13	13
M10	8.0	6.0	6.0	6.0	16	17
M12	10.0	8.0	8.0	8.0	18	19
M16	14.0	10.0	10.0	10.0	24	24
M20	17.0		12.0	12.0	30	30
M24	19.0				36	36
M30	22.0				46	46

For Torx bolts, there is a corresponding size driver prescribed by Acument, the designer of the Torx drive system. As of 2018, there are no ISO standards for hexalobular drive sizes.

ISO 262 sizes	Pan head	Flat head	Socket head	Socket Button	Truss	External Torx
M2.5	T8	T8	T8			
M3	T10	T10	T10	T8		E4
M4	T20	T20	T25	T15	T15	E5
M5	T25	T25	T27	T25	T20	E6
M6	T30	T30	T30	T27	T30	E8
M8	T40	T40	T45	T40	T40	E10
M10	T50	T50	T50	T45	T50	E12
M12			T55	T55	T55	E14
M16			T70	T60		E20
M20			T90			E24
M24			T100			E32
M30						E36

Similarly, for Torx Plus bolts, there is a corresponding size driver prescribed by Acument, the designer of the Torx Plus drive system. As of 2018, there are no ISO standards for hexalobular drive sizes.

ISO 262 sizes	Pan head	Flat head	Socket head	Socket Button	Truss	External Torx
M2.5	8IP	8IP	8IP			4EP
M3	10IP	10IP	10IP	8IP		5EP
M4	20IP	15IP	20IP	15IP	15IP	7EP
M5	25IP	20IP	27IP	25IP	20IP	8EP
M6	30IP	27IP	30IP	27IP	30IP	10EP
M8	45IP	30IP	45IP	40IP	40IP	14EP
M10	50IP	50IP	50IP	45IP	50IP	16EP
M12	55IP	55IP	55IP	55IP	55IP	20EP
M16			70IP	60IP		26EP
M20			90IP			32EP
M24			100IP			40EP
M30						

=== ISO 1307 plastic hose sizes ===
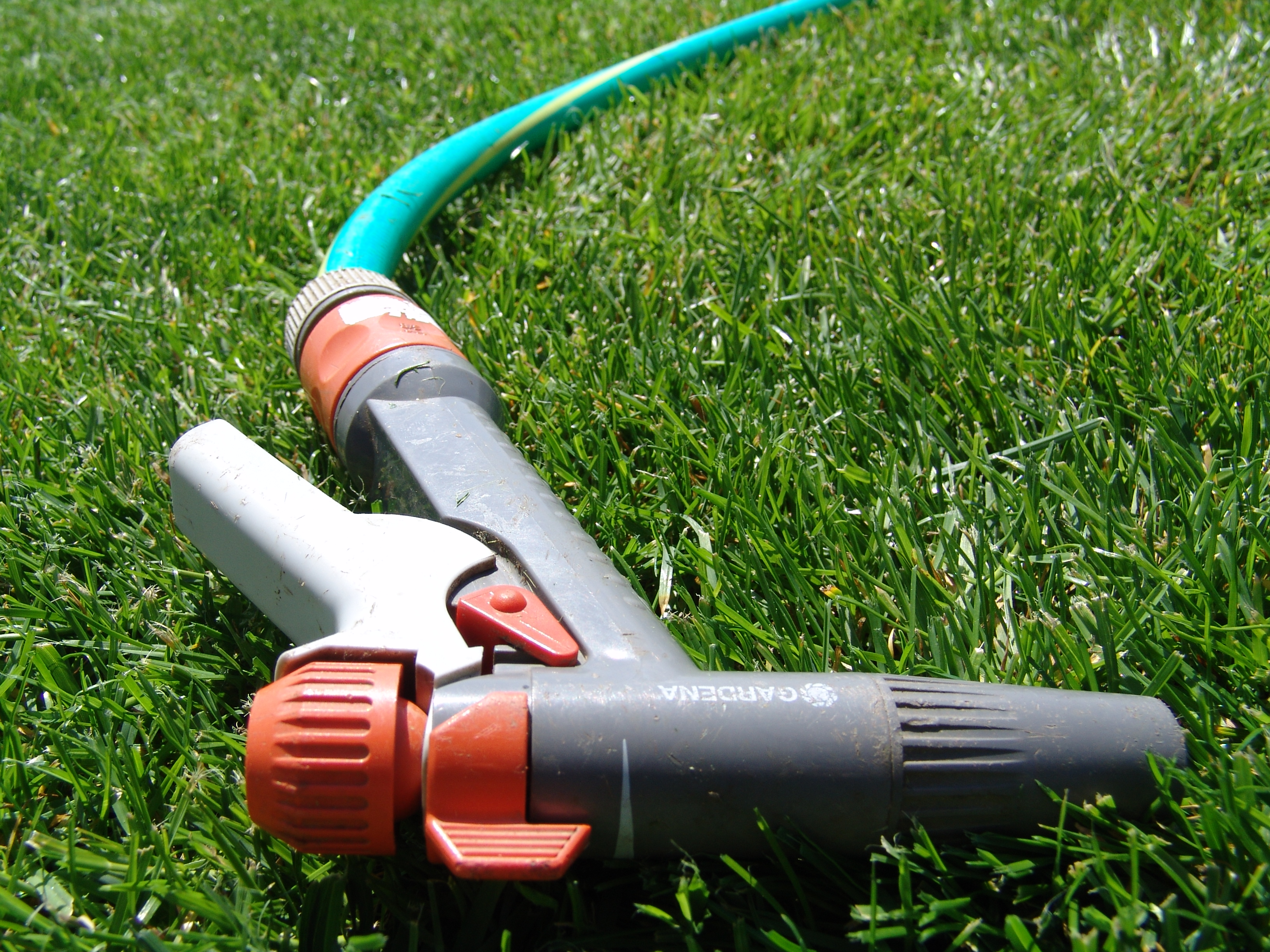
Garden hose with mouthpiece

See also:

- ISO 6708 Nominal Diameter (for garden hose sizes)

ISO 1307:2006, Rubber and plastics hoses—Hose sizes, minimum and maximum inside diameters, and tolerances on cut-to-length hoses specifies nominal diameters for four different types of plastic hoses, including "Type C", which includes the typical garden hose. Each nominal diameter specifies different ID minimum and maximum values. The nominal size is a Renard series.

Nominal Size ID	Type C Non-mandrel-built ID range		Inch equivalent ID
	min	max	
3.2	n/a	n/a	1/8 in
4	3.4	4.6	
5	4.2	5.4	
6.3	5.6	7.2	1/4 in
8	7.2	8.8	
10	8.7	10.3	3/8 in
12.5	11.9	13.5	1/2 in
16	15.1	16.7	5/8 in
19	18.3	19.9	3/4 in
20	19.3	20.9	
25	24.2	26.6	1 in
31.5	30.2	33.4	1 1/4 in
38	36.5	39.7	1 1/2 in

=== ISO 6708 nominal pipe diameter ===
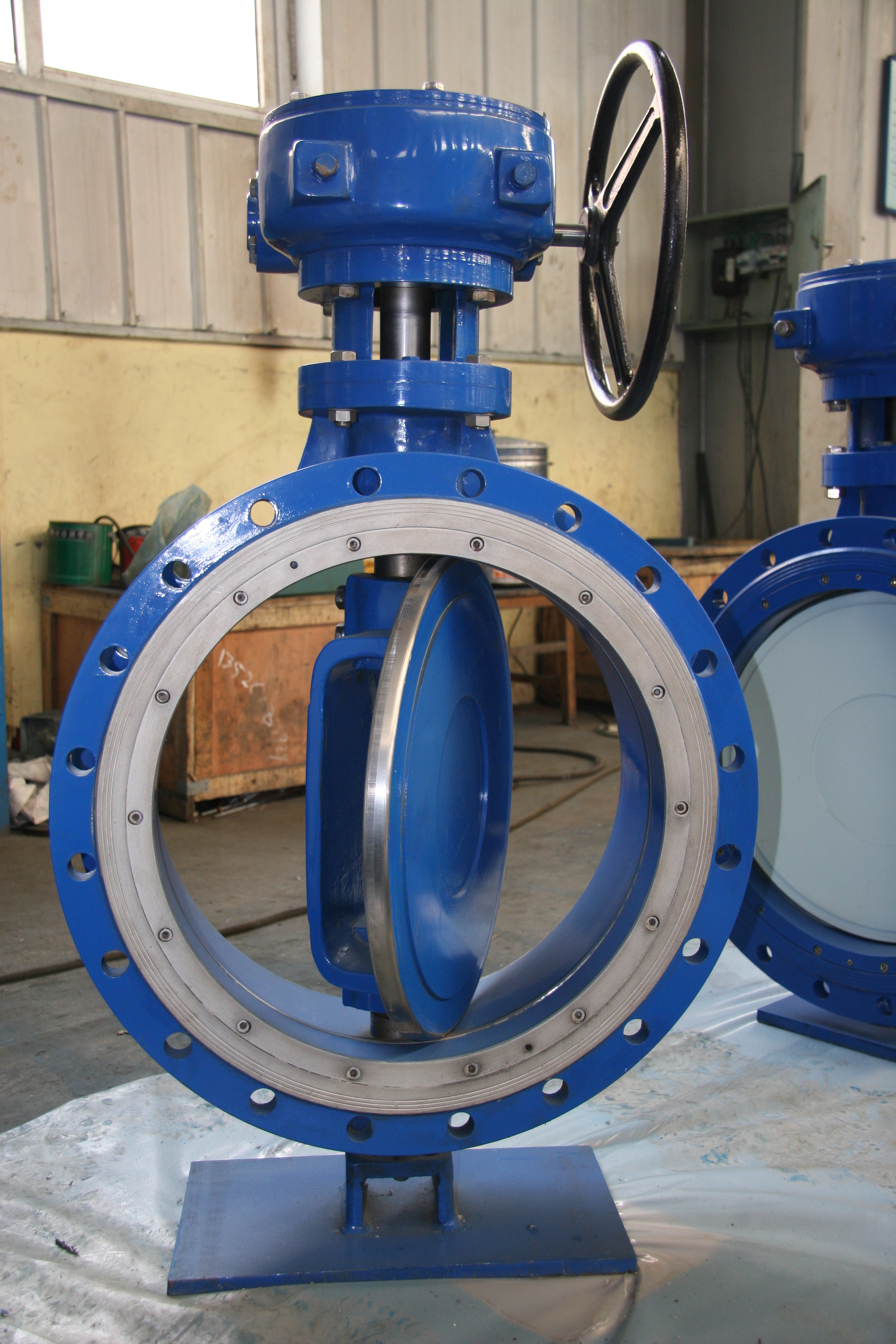
Butterfly valve in a large DN-size.

Nominal diameter, abbreviated DN (diamètre nominal/Durchmesser nach Norm), is the designation system specified by ISO 6708 for specifying the diameter of trade sizes of metric pipework components, and is the metric equivalent to Nominal Pipe Size. It is among several ISO specifications that formalize preferred numbers, and is referred to by numerous other international standards, including ISO 7598 and EN 10255. The complete set of DN values allowed by the standard are:

DN designation	DN designation	DN designation
DN 10	DN 250	DN 1 500
DN 15	DN 300	DN 1 600
DN 20	DN 350	DN 1 800
DN 25	DN 400	DN 2 000
DN 32	DN 450	DN 2 200
DN 40	DN 500	DN 2 400
DN 50	DN 600	DN 2 600
DN 60	DN 700	DN 2 800
DN 65	DN 800	DN 3000
DN 80	DN 900	DN 3200
DN 100	DN 1 000	DN 3 400
DN 125	DN 1 100	DN 3 600
DN 150	DN 1 200	DN 3 800
DN 200	DN 1 400	DN 4 000

The number following the DN is a nominal value that is roughly the number of millimeters of a circular feature on the connection point of the pipe, fitting, coupling, etc., but often differing by a noticeable amount. If the DN value is related to the internal bore diameter of the feature, the size should be represented by DN/ID (for Inside Diameter), and if the DN value is related to the outside diameter, the size should be represented by DN/OD (for Outside Diameter).

The relationship between DN and NPS pipe sizes are as follows. Note that the actual internal diameter varies depending on the pipe wall thickness.

DN	Actual OD	NPS
designation	mm	designation
DN 10	17.2	3/8
DN 15	21.3	1/2
DN 20	26.9	3/4
DN 25	33.7	1
DN 32	42.4	1 1/4
DN 40	48.3	1 1/2
DN 50	60.3	2
DN 65	76.1	2 1/2
DN 80	88.9	3
DN 100	114.3	4
DN 125	139.7	-
DN 150	168.3	6
DN 200	219.1	8
DN 250	273	10
DN 300	323.9	12
DN 350	355.6	14
DN 400	406.4	16
DN 450	457	18
DN 500	508	20
DN 600	610	24
DN 700	711	28
DN 750	762	30
DN 800	813	32
DN 900	914	36
DN 1 000	1016	40
DN 1 200	1220	48

== See also ==
- Adjustable shelving, used in logistics with items and carriers of various standardised and non-standardised sizes
- Eurocontainer, a system for boxes that can be used for reusable packaging for transport and storage
- Gastronorm, a standard for professional kitchenware tray and container sizes
- ISO metric screw thread, the international standard for machine screw threads
- OpenStructures, open specification for modular interfaces in hardware based on a geometrical grid
