= Real value =

Real value may refer to:

- Real versus nominal value: real values are the actual values of something while nominal values are the stated values of something
- Real and nominal value: real values are adjusted for the changes in the value of currency; nominal values are not
- A mathematical value that is a real number
- The real part of a complex number
- A true value
