= Renard series =

System of preferred numbers

The Renard series is a system of preferred numbers dividing an interval from 1 to 10 into 5, 10, 20, or 40 steps. The preferred values are rounded forms of a geometric sequence and can be extended above or below this interval by multiplication or division by powers of ten.

The system is named after the French army engineer Colonel Charles Renard, who developed a system of preferred values during the late nineteenth century. It was later adopted for international standardization and became the basis of ISO Recommendation R3, first published in the 1950s and subsequently superseded by ISO 3.

The factor between consecutive Renard numbers is constant: it is the fifth, 10th, 20th, or 40th root of 10 for the R5, R10, R20, and R40 series, respectively. Since their exact theoretical values are all irrational, they are rounded when used in practice.

The resulting spacing allows a range of sizes to be covered while limiting the number of values that must be standardized, manufactured, or stocked. Renard values have been used for engineering dimensions and ratings, including electrical-component ratings such as fuse currents and capacitor voltages.

Comparison of preferred numbers of the 1–2–5, Renard and f-stop series on a logarithmic scale divided into 40 equal intervals (blue)

== Base R5 series ==
The most basic R5 series consists of five rounded values, which approximate successive powers of the fifth root of 10:

R5: 1.00 1.60 2.50 4.00 6.30

The R5 series may be extended through powers of ten. For example, its values can be expressed as 16, 25, 40, 63, 100, 160, and 250 millimetres when selecting a limited range of nominal product lengths.

Likewise, values such as 100, 160, 250, 400, and 630 volts are examples of preferred voltage ratings derived from the series.

== R10, R20, R40, and R80 series ==
If a finer resolution is needed, intermediate values can be added to form the R10, R20, R40, and R80 series. The R10 series adds five values to R5, while the R20, R40, and R80 series provide successively finer gradations.

In some applications, the values are rounded to fewer decimal places because they are easier to specify, manufacture, or use with integer quantities. ISO 497 provides guidance on selecting such more-rounded preferred-number series. In the table below, rounded values that differ from their less rounded counterparts are shown in bold.

Least rounded
R5	R10	R20	R40	R80 add'l
1.00	1.00	1.00	1.00	1.03
1.00	1.00	1.00	1.06	1.09
1.00	1.00	1.12	1.12	1.15
1.00	1.00	1.12	1.18	1.22
1.00	1.25	1.25	1.25	1.28
1.00	1.25	1.25	1.32	1.36
1.00	1.25	1.40	1.40	1.45
1.00	1.25	1.40	1.50	1.55
1.60	1.60	1.60	1.60	1.65
1.60	1.60	1.60	1.70	1.75
1.60	1.60	1.80	1.80	1.85
1.60	1.60	1.80	1.90	1.95
1.60	2.00	2.00	2.00	2.06
1.60	2.00	2.00	2.12	2.18
1.60	2.00	2.24	2.24	2.30
1.60	2.00	2.24	2.36	2.43
2.50	2.50	2.50	2.50	2.58
2.50	2.50	2.50	2.65	2.72
2.50	2.50	2.80	2.80	2.90
2.50	2.50	2.80	3.00	3.07
2.50	3.15	3.15	3.15	3.25
2.50	3.15	3.15	3.35	3.45
2.50	3.15	3.55	3.55	3.65
2.50	3.15	3.55	3.75	3.87
4.00	4.00	4.00	4.00	4.12
4.00	4.00	4.00	4.25	4.37
4.00	4.00	4.50	4.50	4.62
4.00	4.00	4.50	4.75	4.87
4.00	5.00	5.00	5.00	5.15
4.00	5.00	5.00	5.30	5.45
4.00	5.00	5.60	5.60	5.75
4.00	5.00	5.60	6.00	6.15
6.30	6.30	6.30	6.30	6.50
6.30	6.30	6.30	6.70	6.90
6.30	6.30	7.10	7.10	7.30
6.30	6.30	7.10	7.50	7.75
6.30	8.00	8.00	8.00	8.25
6.30	8.00	8.00	8.50	8.75
6.30	8.00	9.00	9.00	9.25
6.30	8.00	9.00	9.50	9.75
10.0	10.0	10.0	10.0	—

Medium rounded
R′10	R′20	R′40
1.00	1.00	1.00
1.00	1.00	**1.05**
1.00	**1.10**	**1.10**
1.00	**1.10**	**1.20**
1.25	1.25	1.25
1.25	1.25	**1.30**
1.25	1.40	1.40
1.25	1.40	1.50
1.60	1.60	1.60
1.60	1.60	1.70
1.60	1.80	1.80
1.60	1.80	1.90
2.00	2.00	2.00
2.00	2.00	**2.10**
2.00	**2.20**	**2.20**
2.00	**2.20**	**2.40**
2.50	2.50	2.50
2.50	2.50	**2.60**
2.50	2.80	2.80
2.50	2.80	3.00
**3.20**	**3.20**	**3.20**
**3.20**	**3.20**	**3.40**
**3.20**	**3.60**	**3.60**
**3.20**	**3.60**	**3.80**
4.00	4.00	4.00
4.00	4.00	**4.20**
4.00	4.50	4.50
4.00	4.50	**4.80**
5.00	5.00	5.00
5.00	5.00	5.30
5.00	5.60	5.60
5.00	5.60	6.00
6.30	6.30	6.30
6.30	6.30	6.70
6.30	7.10	7.10
6.30	7.10	7.50
8.00	8.00	8.00
8.00	8.00	8.50
8.00	9.00	9.00
8.00	9.00	9.50
10.0	10.0	10.0

Most rounded
R″5	R″10	R″20	—
1.0	1.0	1.0	—
1.0	1.0	1.0	—
1.0	1.0	1.1	—
1.0	1.0	1.1	—
1.0	**1.2**	**1.2**	—
1.0	**1.2**	**1.2**	—
1.0	**1.2**	1.4	—
1.0	**1.2**	1.4	—
**1.5**	**1.5**	1.6	—
**1.5**	**1.5**	1.6	—
**1.5**	**1.5**	1.8	—
**1.5**	**1.5**	1.8	—
**1.5**	2.0	2.0	—
**1.5**	2.0	2.0	—
**1.5**	2.0	2.2	—
**1.5**	2.0	2.2	—
2.5	2.5	2.5	—
2.5	2.5	2.5	—
2.5	2.5	2.8	—
2.5	2.5	2.8	—
2.5	**3.0**	**3.0**	—
2.5	**3.0**	**3.0**	—
2.5	**3.0**	**3.5**	—
2.5	**3.0**	**3.5**	—
4.0	4.0	4.0	—
4.0	4.0	4.0	—
4.0	4.0	4.5	—
4.0	4.0	4.5	—
4.0	5.0	5.0	—
4.0	5.0	5.0	—
4.0	5.0	**5.5**	—
4.0	5.0	**5.5**	—
**6.0**	**6.0**	**6.0**	—
**6.0**	**6.0**	**6.0**	—
**6.0**	**6.0**	**7.0**	—
**6.0**	**6.0**	**7.0**	—
**6.0**	8.0	8.0	—
**6.0**	8.0	8.0	—
**6.0**	8.0	9.0	—
**6.0**	8.0	9.0	—
10	10	10	—

Because Renard values repeat after each tenfold change in scale, they can be used conveniently with SI-based dimensions and other decimal quantities.

Each of the Renard sequences can be reduced to a subset by taking every nth value in a series, which is designated by adding the number n after a slash. For example, "R10″/3 (1…1000)" designates a series consisting of every third value in the R″10 series from 1 to 1000, that is, 1, 2, 4, 8, 15, 30, 60, 120, 250, 500, 1000.

== Applications ==
Renard series are used when designers must balance a wide range of possible values against the cost and complexity of maintaining many different sizes. ISO 17 recommends choosing the series with the widest spacing that still satisfies the technical requirement.

The series have also influenced standard preferred-frequency systems used in acoustics. ISO 266 specifies preferred frequencies for acoustical measurement.

== See also ==
- Preferred numbers
- Preferred metric sizes
- 1–2–5 series
- E series (preferred numbers)
- Logarithm
- Decibel
- Neper
- Phon
- Nominal Pipe Size (NPS)
- Geometric progression

Preceded by ISO 2	Lists of ISOs; ISO 3	Succeeded by ISO 4

Preceded by ISO 16	Lists of ISOs; ISO 17	Succeeded by ISO 18
