= Flowerpot =

Container in pottery or plastic in which flowers and plants are held

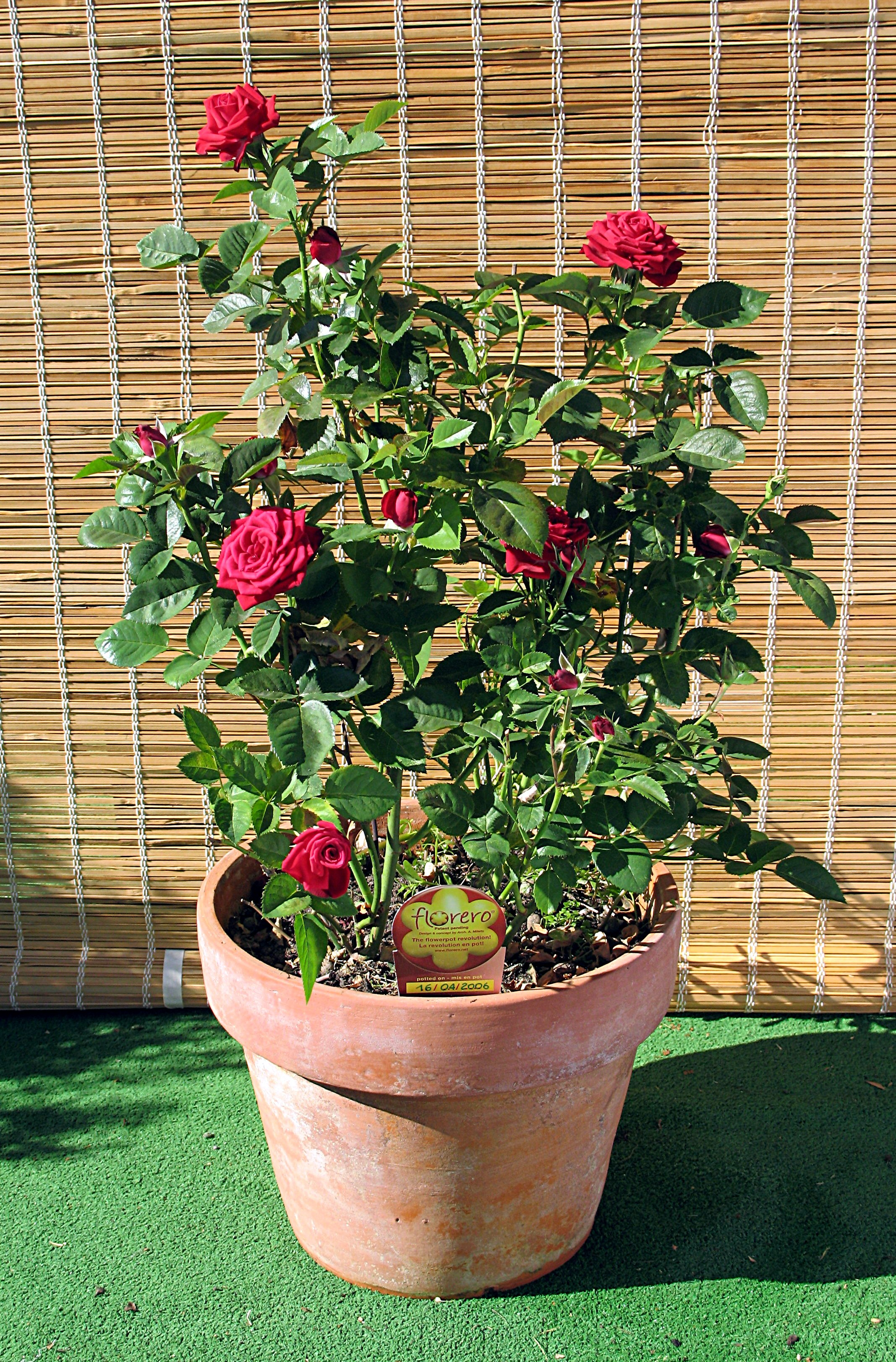
Meillandine rose in a terracotta flowerpot

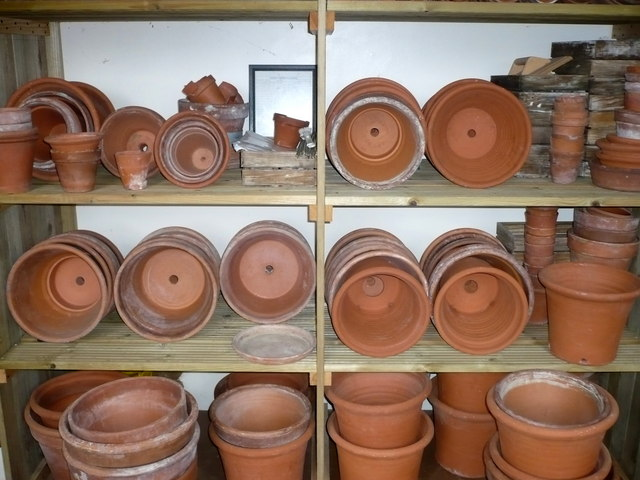
Traditional flowerpots in unglazed terracotta in Charles Darwin's laboratory at Down House

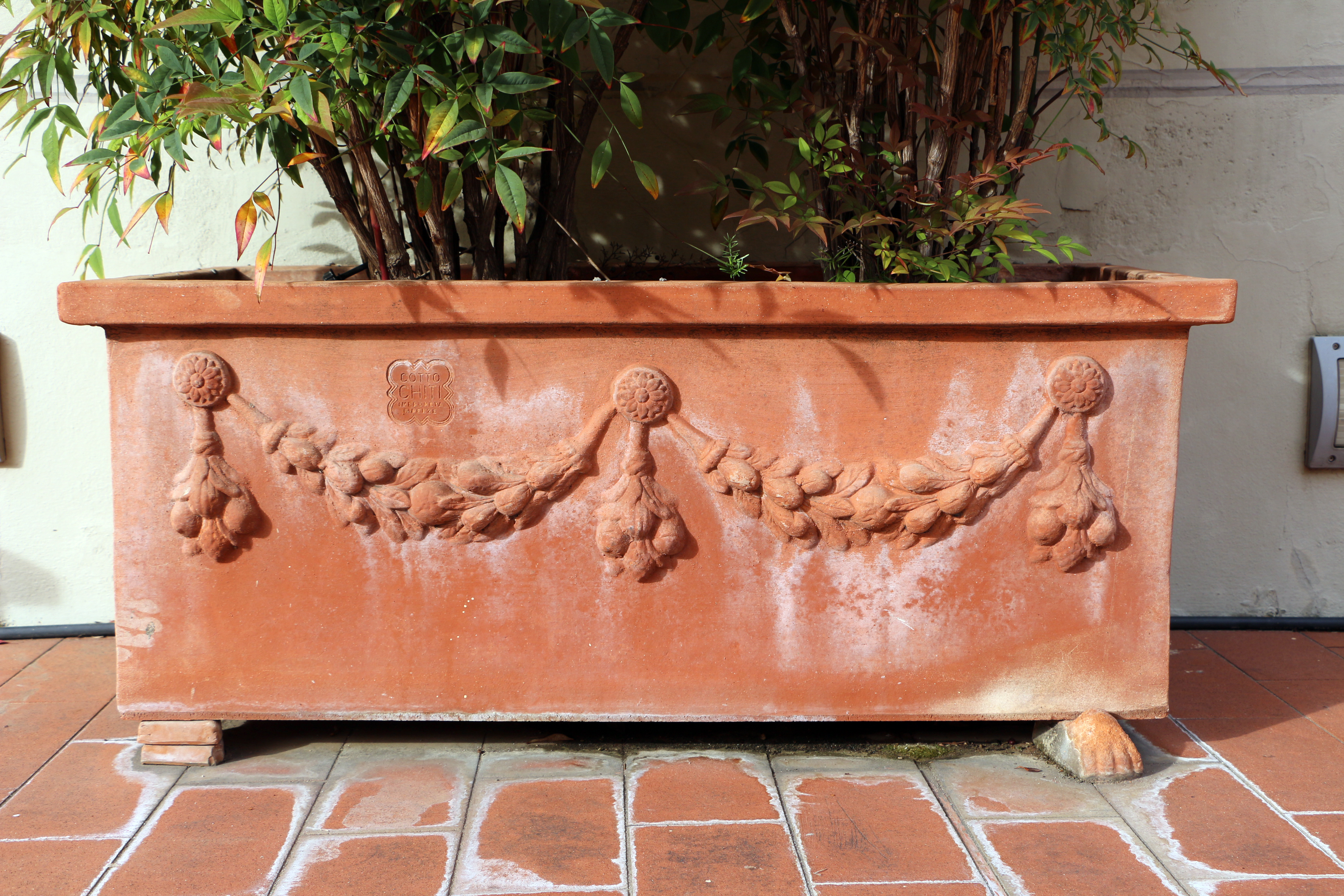
Terracotta flowerpot in Italy, decorated with festoons

A flowerpot, planter, planterette or plant pot is a container in which flowers and other plants are cultivated and displayed. Historically, and still to a significant extent today, they are made from plain terracotta with no ceramic glaze, with a round shape, tapering inwards towards the bottom. Flowerpots are now often also made from plastic, metal, wood, stone, or sometimes biodegradable material. An example of biodegradable pots are ones made of heavy brown paper, cardboard, or peat moss in which young plants for transplanting are grown.

For seedling starting in commercial greenhouses or polytunnels, pots usually take the form of trays with cells, each cell acting as one small pot. These trays are often called flats.

There are usually holes in the bottom of pots, to allow excess water to flow out, sometimes to a saucer that is placed under the flowerpot.

== Purpose ==
Flowerpots have a number of uses such as transporting plants to new locations, starting seeds, patio and indoor cultivation of plants, and the growing of tender plants in colder regions indoors. Through the centuries, the use of flowerpots has influenced the horticultural use of plants, and the Egyptians were among the first to use pots to move plants from one location to another. The Romans brought potted plants inside during cold weather. In the 18th century, pots were used to ship breadfruit seedlings from Tahiti to the West Indies. Also Orchids, African violets and Pelargonium geraniums were shipped in pots from other parts of the world, including Africa, to North America and Europe.

In the 18th century, Josiah Wedgwood's flowerpots or cachepots, were very popular; they were often highly decorative and used as table centrepieces.

In Athens, earthenware flowerpots were thrown into the sea during the festival of the Gardens of Adonis. Theophrastus, c. 371 – c. 287 BC, mentions that a plant called southern-wood was raised and propagated in pots because it was difficult to grow.

The top of the flowerpot underneath the rim is commonly known as the shoulder or collar and can aid handling.

== Classification ==
Flower pots were traditionally made from terracotta. They were made and sold by the cast, which is the number of pots produced from a given quantity of clay.

The traditional sizes were as follows, although others existed:

Name	No. to cast	Top diameter (inches)	Depth (inches)
Ones	1	20	18
Twos	2	18	14
Fours	4	15	13
Sixes	6	13	12
Eights	8	12	11
Twelves	12	11.5	10
Sixteens	16	9.5	9
Twenty-fours	24	8.5	8
Thirty-twos	32	6	6
Forty-eights	48	4.5	5
Sixties	60	3	3.5
Seventy-twos or thimbles	72	2.5	
Thumbs	80	2.5	2.5
Nineties or thumbs	90	1	

Other sources give different values, and sometimes names, for the smaller pots, for example The Gardener's Everyday Log Book while agreeing on "twos" to "thirty-twos" has two different types of "sixties" and disagrees on "thumbs" and "thimbles":

Name	Top diameter (inches)	Depth (inches)
Large sixties	4	3.5
Small sixties	3	3
Thumbs	2.5	2.5
Thimbles	2	2

A taller and thinner shape of pot, suitable for deep-rooting plants, was known as a long tom, a term still used. The traditional size for a long tom used for auriculas was 3 in diameter by 3.75 to 4 in depth.

== Nursery ==
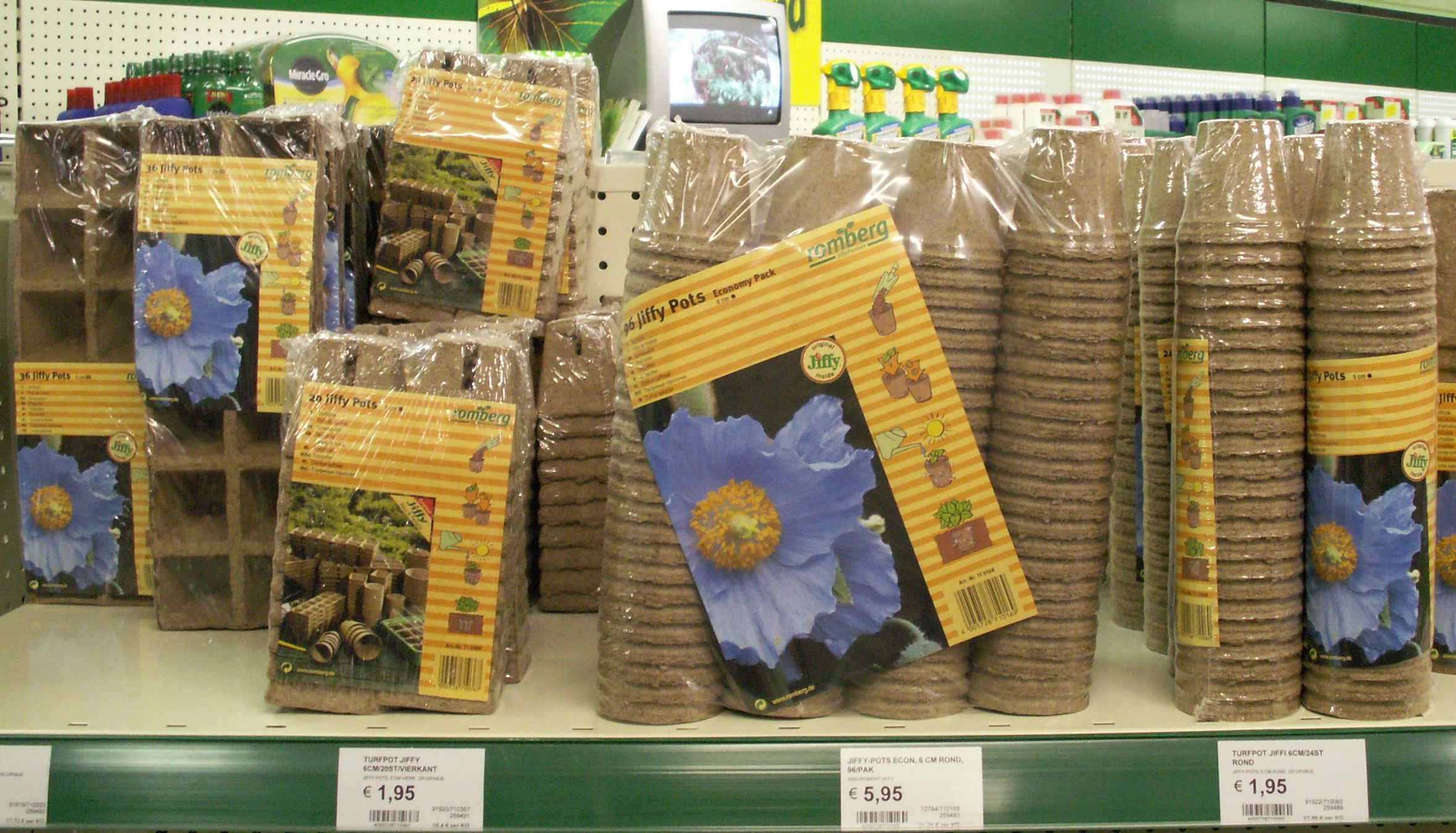
Peat pots that are biodegradable and may be planted directly into the soil

In the nursery business, plants are generally grown in round or square plastic pots. Some organisations (such as the Royal Horticultural Society) encourage the reuse of (plastic) plant pots and trays across their retail centres. In some garden centres (i.e. Edibleculture), this is done by not letting the plastic growing pots leave the garden centre, and simply place the plant inside a cardboard (or newspaper) sleeve for transportation. Peat pots and paper pots are also being used, and have the advantage of facilitating transplanting as they do not need to be pulled out of a container for planting purposes (rather, the whole of container and plant is directly planted). Also, for sale purposes, there is no need to recover the container as it is biodegradable and can not and does not need to be reused or recycled. Some types exist focusing on vegetables, whereas other paper pot systems exist that focus on larger plants (i.e. trees, sugar cane, etc.)

=== United States ===
The sizes of plastic pots have been assigned an ANSI standard by the American Nursery and Landscape Association. Pots designated #1–#100 nominally have the volume of that many gallons, but in fact a #1 pot has a capacity of 0.625 gallons (a "trade gallon"). There is also a Small Plant series: SP1, 6.5–8.0 in^{3}; SP2, 13.0–15.0 in^{3}; SP3, 20.0–30.0 in^{3}; SP4, 51–63 in^{3}; SP5, 93–136 in^{3}. An SP4 pot is commonly called a "4-inch" or "quart" container.

=== Europe ===
Plastic pots come in a number of standard sizes, with a code indicating the approximate dimensions of the diameter at the top.

Code	Diameter (cm)	Height (cm)	Volume (L)	Approx. (inches)
6F	6	6		2.2
8F	8	7.5		3
9F	9	9		3.5
10F	10	9.5	0.5	4
13F/14A	13	12	0.9	5.5
15F	15	14		6

== Size ==
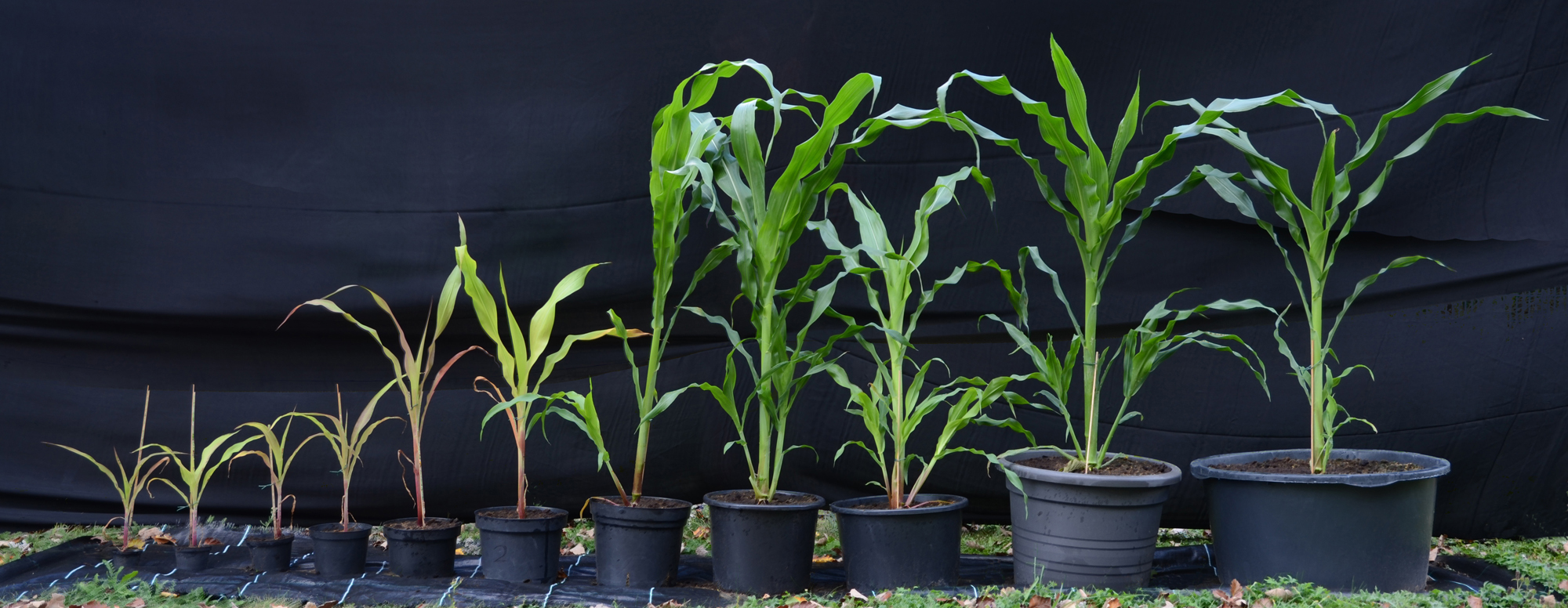
The effect of pot size on the growth of maize

The size of the pot will in part determine the size of the plants. Generally, plants planted in bigger pots will end up being larger; on average plants increase 40–45% in biomass for a doubling in pot volume. This will in part be due to a higher availability of nutrients and water in larger pots, but also because roots will get less pot-bound. This does not mean that all plants will thrive better in bigger pots. Especially for succulents it is important that the soil does not stay wet for a long time, as this may cause their roots to rot. The smaller those plants are relative to the soil volume, the longer they take to use all pot water. Bonsai plants are also purposely planted in small pots, not only for aesthetics but also because the low supply of nutrients keeps the leaves smaller and the growth down. Because they are often not as drought resistant as succulents, this implies they have to be watered often.

== Shape ==
Water in the soil of high pots is more easily pulled down by gravitational forces than in low pots, and hence the soil does not remain wet for a long time. This is relevant as plant roots of most species do not only need water, but also air (oxygen). If the potting soil is too wet plants may suffer from a lack of oxygen around the roots.

== Material ==
The soil in black pots exposed to sunlight will warm up more quickly than soil in white pots. Clay pots are permeable for water and therefore water from inside the pot soil can evaporate through the walls out of the pot. Pots that are glazed or made from plastic lose less water through evaporation. If they have no holes at the bottom either, plants may suffer from remaining too wet.

== Gallery ==
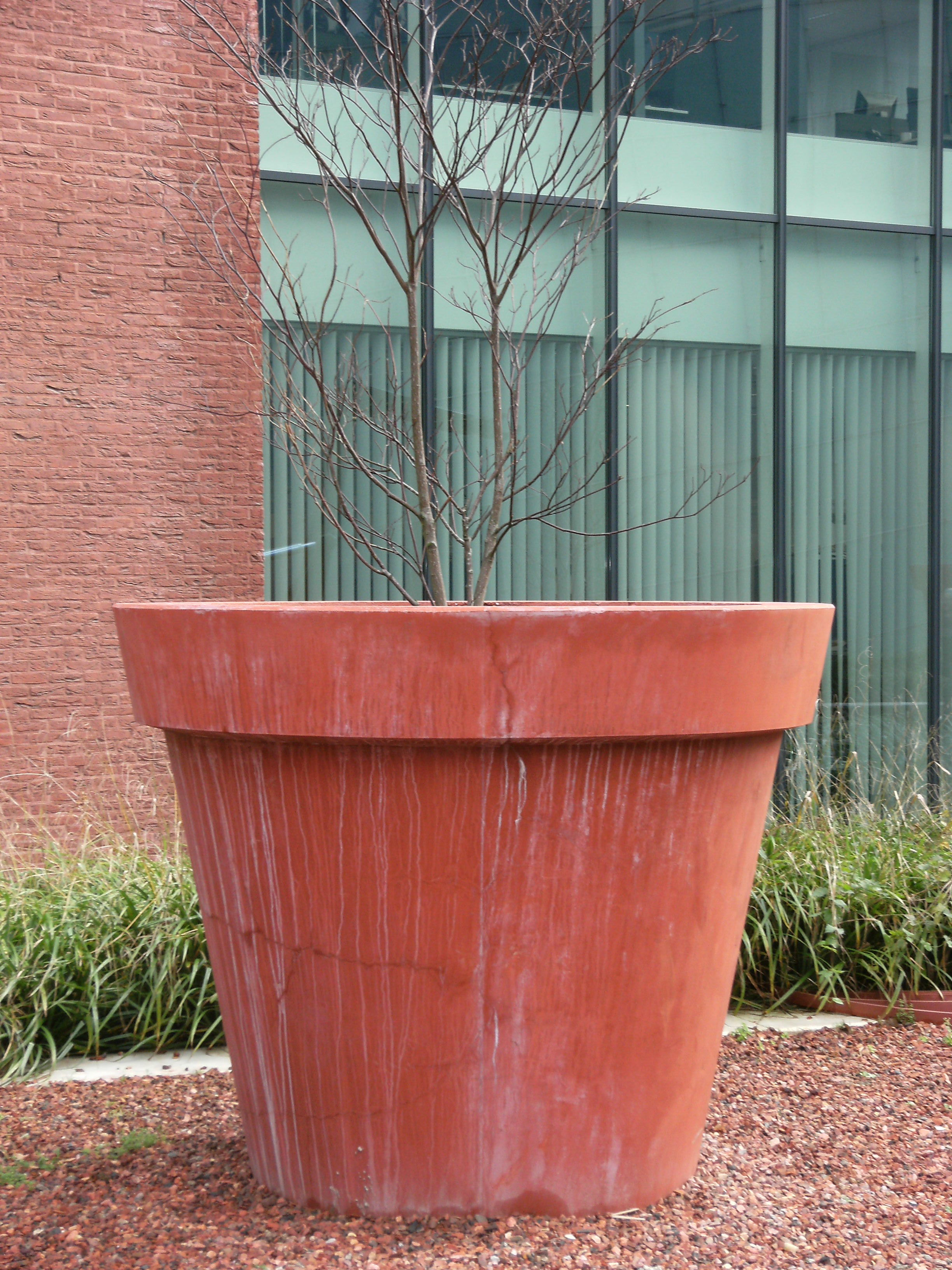
Giant flowerpot

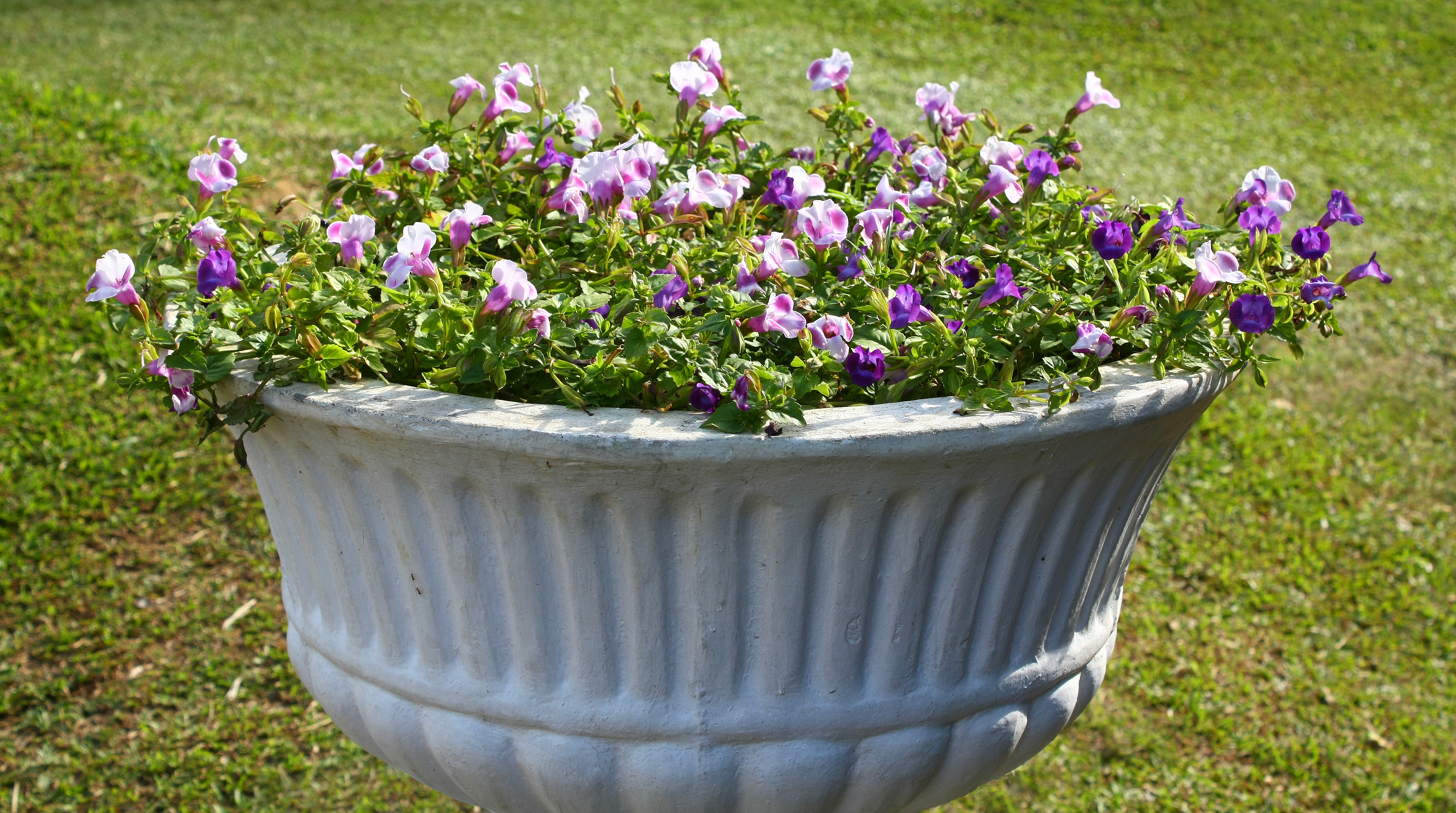
Torenia flowers in a flowerpot

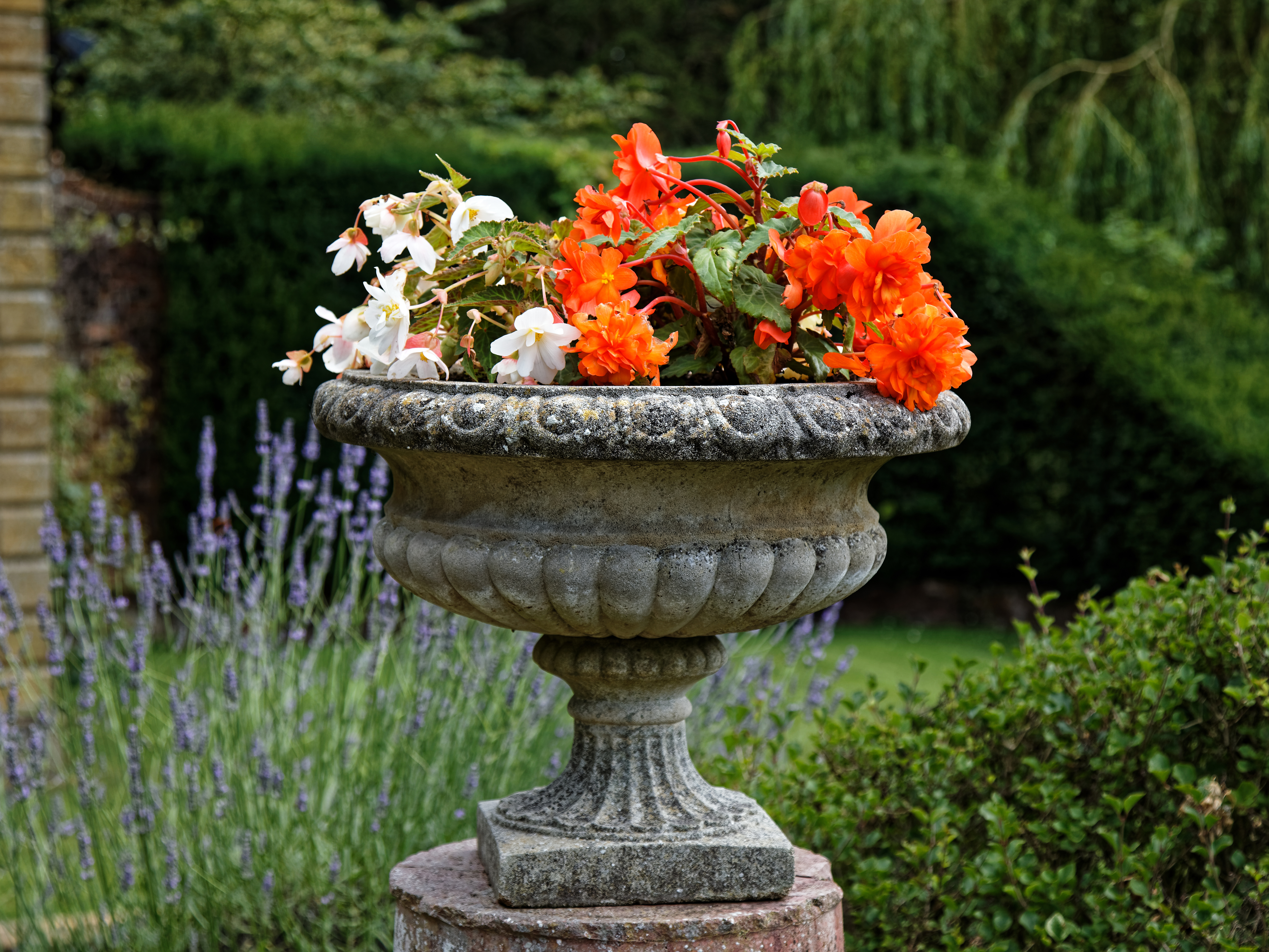
An ornamental planter at Easton Lodge Gardens, Little Easton, Essex, England

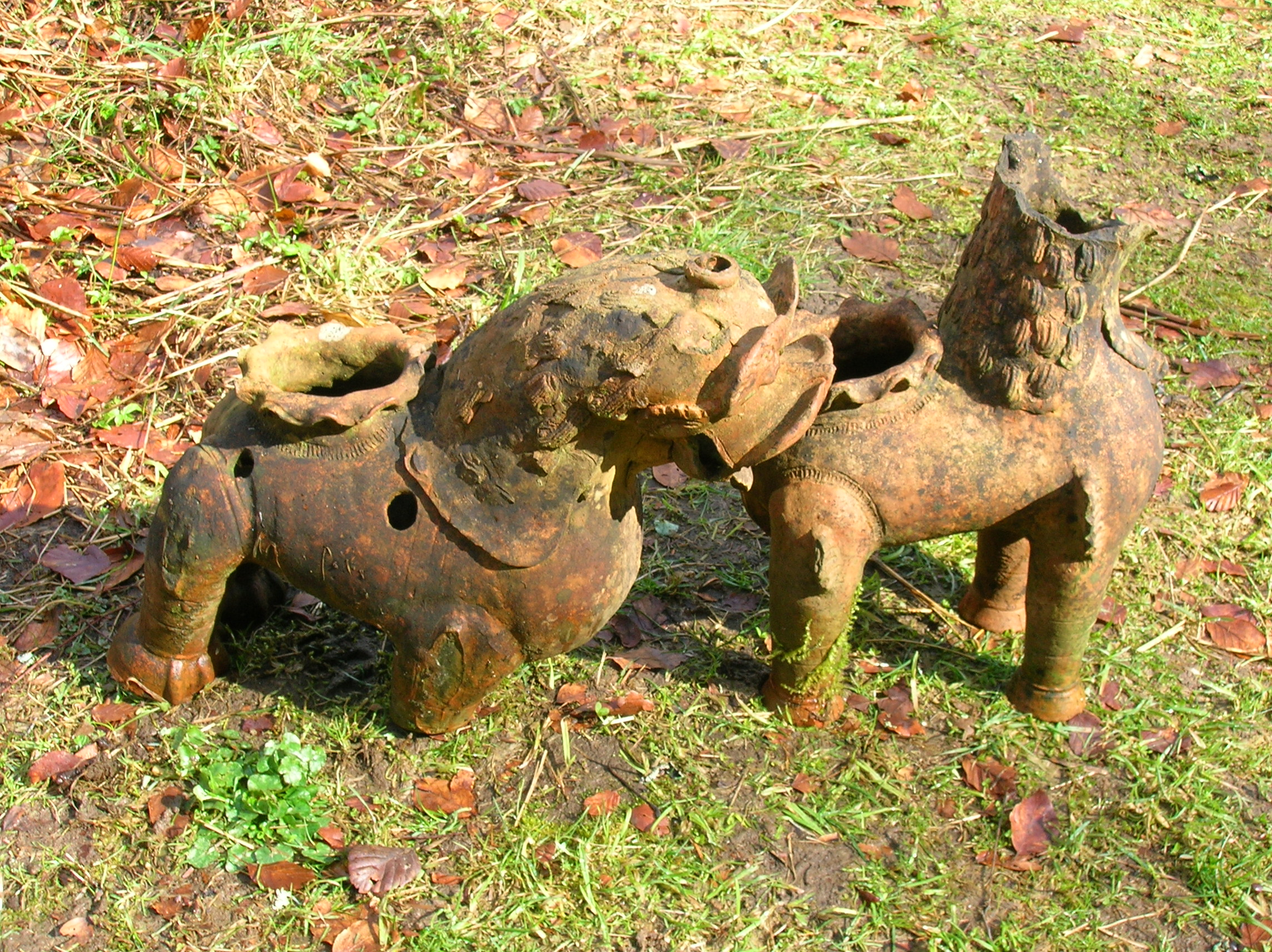
Victorian decorative flowerpots at Kindrogan House, Enochdu, Scotland

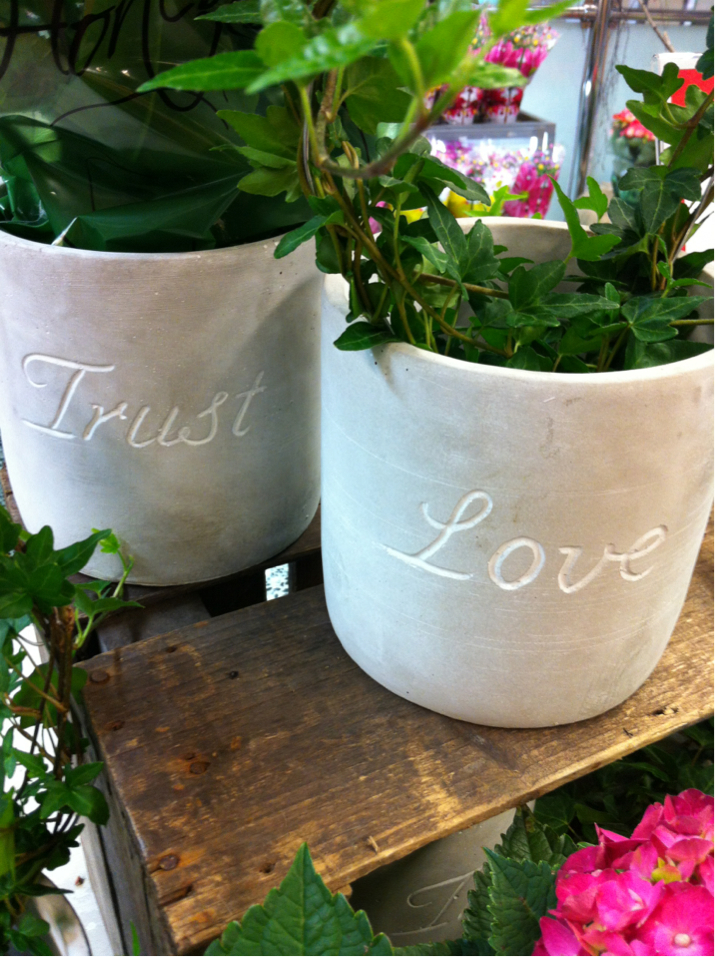
Flowerpots with the words "Trust" and "Love" on them

== See also ==
- Dutch flower bucket
- Disposable food packaging (i.e. yogurt pots): can be used as plant pots
- Drip irrigation
- Growbag
- Urban agriculture
- Cardboard toilet paper rolls: can be used as plant pots
- Vertical farming
- Window box
