= Weld-On =

Weld-On Adhesives, Inc.
- Founded: 1954
- Headquarters: Compton, California, United States
- Products: solvent cements, primers and cleaners, adhesives
- Website: www.weldon.com

Weld-On is a division of IPS Corporation, a manufacturer of solvent cements, primers, and cleaners for PVC, CPVC, and ABS plastic piping systems. Weld-On products are commonly used for joining plastic pipes and fittings. Weld-On also manufactures specialty products from repair adhesives for leaking pipes, pipe thread sealants / joint compounds, to test plugs for pipeline pressure testing. Their products are most commonly utilized in the irrigation, industrial, pool & spa, electrical conduit, and plumbing industries.

Headquartered in California, Weld-On has operations throughout the United States, as well as in China, and a worldwide network of sales representatives and distributors.

== History ==
- 1954: Weld-On founded and established as a division of IPS Corporation.
- 1955: Weld-On developed the first clear, reactive acrylic adhesive that met U.S. Department of Defense military specification (MIL-SPEC) for use on aircraft canopies
- 1958: IPS Corporation began endorsing the solvent welding technique, a type of plastic welding, and patented Weld-On solvent cement for use on plastic pipe and fittings.
- 1978: Weld-On developed and released color-match acrylic adhesive for bonding solid surface countertops.
- 1992: Weld-On formulated and introduced the first low volatile organic compound (VOC) emission solvent cement in response to growing air quality concerns.
- 1997: Weld-On 724 was introduced as the first high-strength solvent cement for chemical resistant CPVC plastic joints in the market and formulated for use in a variety of harsh chemical applications such as hypochlorites, acids and caustics.
- 1999: Weld-On began offering environmentally-responsible, all low-VOC solvent cements, primers and cleaners, and began phasing out regular VOC products.
