= Chlorinated polyvinyl chloride =

Names
- Other names Chlorinated PVC, Polychloroethylene, "Ethene, chloro-, homopolymer, chlorinated"

Identifiers
CAS Number	68648-82-8
Abbreviations	CPVC, PVC-C
ECHA InfoCard	100.122.975
CompTox Dashboard (EPA)	DTXSID90100689

Properties
Chemical formula	(C_{9}H_{11}Cl_{7})_{n}, for 67% Cl polymer
- Except where otherwise noted, data are given for materials in their standard state (at 25 °C [77 °F], 100 kPa). Infobox references

Chlorinated polyvinyl chloride
- Material type: Thermoplastic

Physical properties
- Density (ρ): 1.56 g/cm^{3}
- Water absorption—Equilibrium (ASTM): 0.04–0.40

Mechanical properties
- Young's modulus (E): 2.9–3.4 GPa
- Tensile strength (σ_{t}): 50–80 MPa
- Elongation (ε) at break: 20–40%
- Notch test: 2–5 kJ/m^{2}

Thermal properties
- Melting temperature (T_{m}): 150 °C
- Glass transition temperature (T_{g}): 106–115 °C
- Vicat softening point—50 N (Vicat B): 106–115 °C
- Thermal conductivity (k): 0.16 W/(m·K)
- Linear thermal expansion coefficient (α): 8×10^{−5} K^{−1}
- Specific heat capacity (c): 0.9 kJ/(kg·K)

Economics
- Price: $2.50–3.02/ft; €0.5–1.25/kg

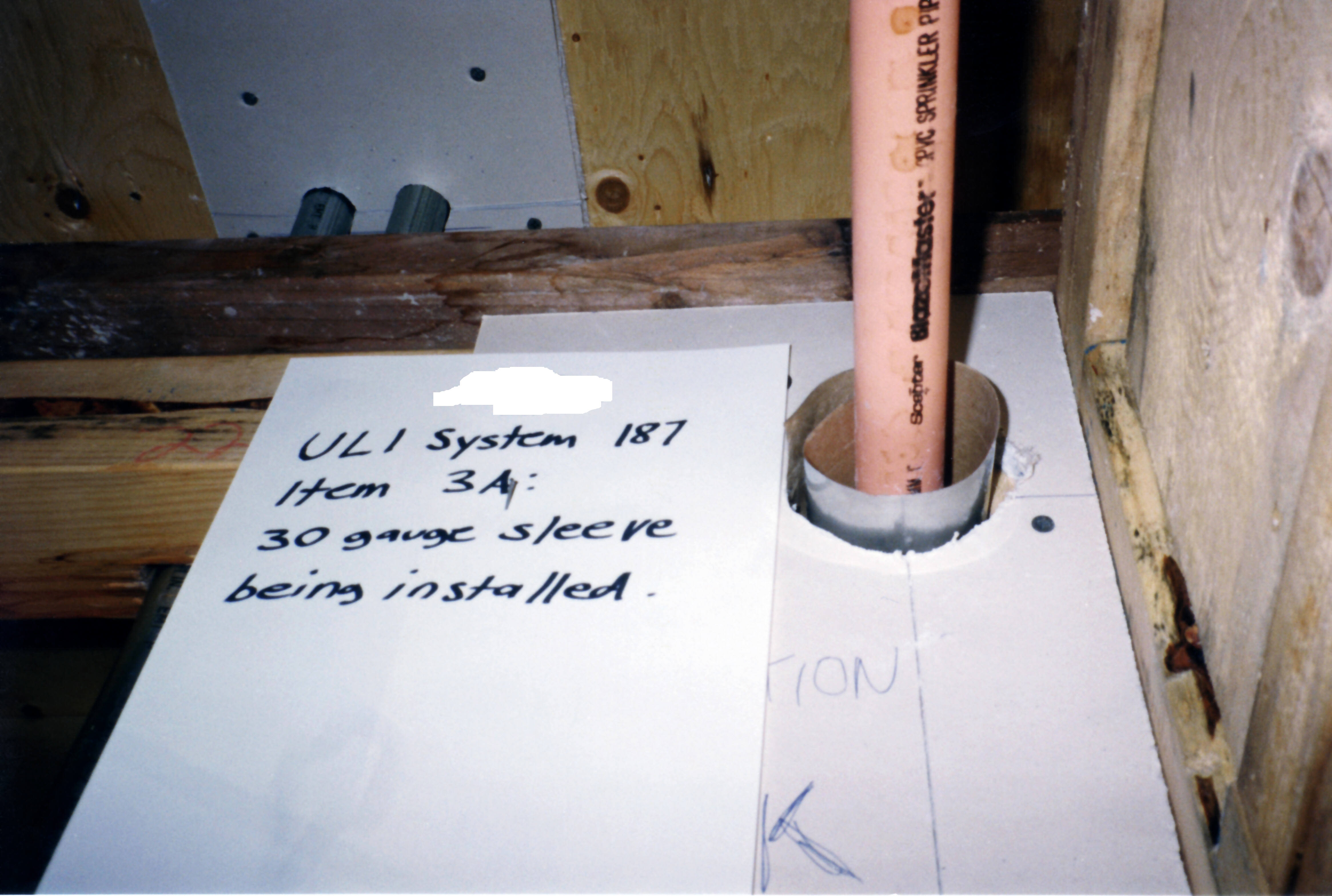
CPVC sprinkler pipe inside a firestop mock-up

Chlorinated polyvinyl chloride (CPVC) is a thermoplastic produced by chlorination of polyvinyl chloride (PVC) resin. CPVC is significantly more flexible than PVC and withstands higher temperatures. Uses include hot and cold water delivery pipes and industrial liquid handling. CPVC, like PVC, is deemed safe for the transport and use of potable water.

== History ==
Genova Products located in Michigan initially created the first CPVC tubing and fittings for hot- and cold-water distribution systems in the early 1960s. The original tetrahydrofuran (THF) / methyl ethyl ketone (MEK) formulas for CPVC cements were developed by Genova in conjunction with the B.F. Goodrich Company, the original developer of the CPVC resin.

== Production process ==
Chlorinated polyvinyl chloride (CPVC) is PVC that has been chlorinated via a free-radical chlorination reaction. This reaction is typically initiated by application of thermal or UV energy utilizing various approaches. In the process, chlorine gas is decomposed into free radical chlorine which is then reacted with PVC in a post-production step, essentially replacing a portion of the hydrogen in the PVC with chlorine.

Depending on the method, a varying amount of chlorine is introduced into the polymer allowing for a measured way to fine-tune the final properties. The chlorine content may vary from manufacturer to manufacturer; the base can be as low as PVC 56.7% to as high as 74% by mass, although most commercial resins have chlorine content from 63% to 69%. As the chlorine content in CPVC is increased, its glass transition temperature (T_{g}) increases significantly. Under normal operating conditions, CPVC becomes unstable at 70% mass of chlorine.

Various additives are also introduced into the resin in order to make the material more receptive to processing. These additives may consist of stabilizers, impact modifiers, pigments and lubricants.

== Physical properties ==
CPVC shares most of the features and properties of PVC, but also has some key differences. CPVC is readily workable, including machining, welding, and forming. Because of its excellent corrosion resistance at elevated temperatures, CPVC is ideally suited for self-supporting constructions where temperatures up to 200 °F (93 °C) are present. The ability to bend, shape, and weld CPVC enables its use in a wide variety of processes and applications. It exhibits fire-retardant properties.

== Comparison to polyvinyl chloride (PVC) ==
=== Heat resistance ===
CPVC can withstand corrosive water at temperatures greater than PVC, typically greater by 40–50 °C (greater by 72–90 °F), contributing to its popularity as a material for water-piping systems in residential and commercial construction. CPVC maximal operating temperature peaks at 200 °F (93 °C).

=== Mechanical properties ===
The principal mechanical difference between CPVC and PVC is that CPVC is significantly more ductile, allowing greater flexure and crush resistance. Additionally, the mechanical strength of CPVC makes it a viable candidate to replace many types of metal pipe in conditions where metal's susceptibility to corrosion limits its use.

Properties of CPVC and PVC
	Schedule 40		Schedule 80	
	CPVC	PVC	CPVC	PVC
Max. working pressure	450 psi (3,100 kPa)	450 psi (3,100 kPa)	630 psi (4,300 kPa)	630 psi (4,300 kPa)
Tensile strength	8,200 psi (57,000 kPa)	7,500 psi (52,000 kPa)	8,200 psi (57,000 kPa)	7,500 psi (52,000 kPa)
Temperature limits	33–200 °F (1–93 °C)	33–140 °F (1–60 °C)	33–200 °F (1–93 °C)	33–140 °F (1–60 °C)

Additionally, CPVC is a thermoplastic and as such has greater insulation than that of copper pipes. Due to this increased insulation, CPVC experiences less condensation formation and better maintains water temperature for both hot and cold applications.

=== Bonding ===
Due to its specific composition, bonding CPVC requires a specialized solvent cement different from PVC, with high-strength formulas being first introduced in 1965 by Genova Products, followed by alternatives such as IPS's Weld-On line.

Primers, solvent cements, and bonding agents for CPVC reportedly must meet ASTM F493 specifications, differing from PVC solvent cements that must adhere to ASTM D2564 standards.

=== Fire properties ===
CPVC is similar to PVC in resistance to fire. It is typically very difficult to ignite and tends to self-extinguish when not in a directly applied flame.

Due to its chlorine content, burning CPVC in an incinerator, structure fire, vehicle fire, bonfire, or burn pit produces hydrogen chloride, a toxic irritant, and polychlorinated dibenzodioxins and polychlorinated dibenzofurans, both of which are known developmental toxicants and suspected human carcinogens; persistent organic pollutants which bioaccumulate.

== See also ==
- Chlorinated polyethylene, the same C–C–C backbone, with less-orderly chlorination
- Cross-linked polyethylene (PEX), the same C–C–C backbone, not chlorinated but cross-linked
- Polyethylene
- Polybutylene
