= Convenient number =

A convenient number is a number which in several situations can prove convenient for use by humans for counting and measuring, and is related to preferred numbers (which are standard recommendations used for choosing product dimensions).

The convenient numbers in this article were developed in the US in connection with the attempted introduction of the metric system in the United States in the 1970s. Hence, they may be viewed as a recommendation for choosing product dimensions when switching to the metric system.

== History ==
In the 1970s, the American National Bureau of Standards (NBS), which was later renamed to the National Institute of Standards and Technology (NIST), defined a set of convenient numbers when it was developing procedures for metrication in the United States.

An NBS technical note describes that system of convenient metric values as the 1-2-5 series in reverse, with assigned preferences for those numbers which are multiples of 5, 2, and 1 (plus their powers of 10). Linear dimensions above 100 mm were excluded (because such measurements are defined by another set of rules). A table of this 5, 2, 1 series can be seen below in the section "Schedule of convenient numbers between 10 and 100".

The NBS technical note also states that "Integers are more convenient than expressions which include decimal parts [decimal fractions]. Furthermore, where measuring devices are used, values which represent numbered subdivisions on such instruments are more useful than values which have to be interpolated. For example, where a tape or a scale is graduated in intervals of 5, any value that represents a multiple of 5 is more "convenient" to measure or verify than one which is not. In addition, where operations involve the subdivision of quantities into two or more equal parts, any number that is highly divisible has an explicit advantage."

== Schedule of convenient numbers between 10 and 100 ==
1st preference n × 50	2nd preference n × 20	3rd preference n × 10	4th preference n × 5	5th preference n × 2	6th preference n × 1
		10			
					11
				12	
					13
				14	
			15		
				16	
					17
				18	
					19
	20				
					21
				22	
					23
				24	
			25*		
				26	
					27
				28	
					29
		30			
					31
				32	
					33
				34	
			35		
				36	
					37
				38	
					39
	40				
					41
				42	
					43
				44	
			45		
				46	
					47
				48	
					49
50
					51
				52	
					53
				54	
			55		
				56	
					57
				58	
					59
	60				
					61
				62	
					63
				64	
			65		
				66	
					67
				68	
					69
		70			
					71
				72	
					73
				74	
			75*		
				76	
					77
				78	
					79
	80				
					81
				82	
					83
				84	
			85		
				86	
					87
				88	
					89
		90			
					91
				92	
					93
				94	
			95		
				96	
					97
				98	
					99
100

Notes:

1. Numbers are shown once only, in the highest applicable preference column. (For example, the number 20 would occur as 3rd, 4th, 5th, and 6th preference as well as 2nd preference).
2. In some contexts, 25 and 75 may become 2nd preferences rather than 4th preferences.

The Technical Note also states, "In the practical application of a "convenient numbers approach" to the selection of suitable metric values, it is desirable to start with the highest possible preference and then gradually refine the difference until an acceptable and convenient metric value has been found."

== See also ==
- Preferred number
- Preferred metric sizes
- Idoneal number
- 1-2-5 series
- E-series of preferred numbers
