= ISO 2848 =

Building construction standard for positioning

ISO 2848 (Building construction – Modular coordination – Principles and rules) is an international standard for the construction industry that describes the aims of modular coordination and gives the rules to be used in establishing the dimensions and positioning of buildings and their components.

== Overview ==
ISO 2848:1984, published by International Organization for Standardization, is an ISO standard used by the construction industry.

Adherence to the standard means that major dimensions such as grid lines on drawings, distances between wall centres or surfaces, widths of shelves and kitchen components are multiples of the basic module.

== Definitions ==
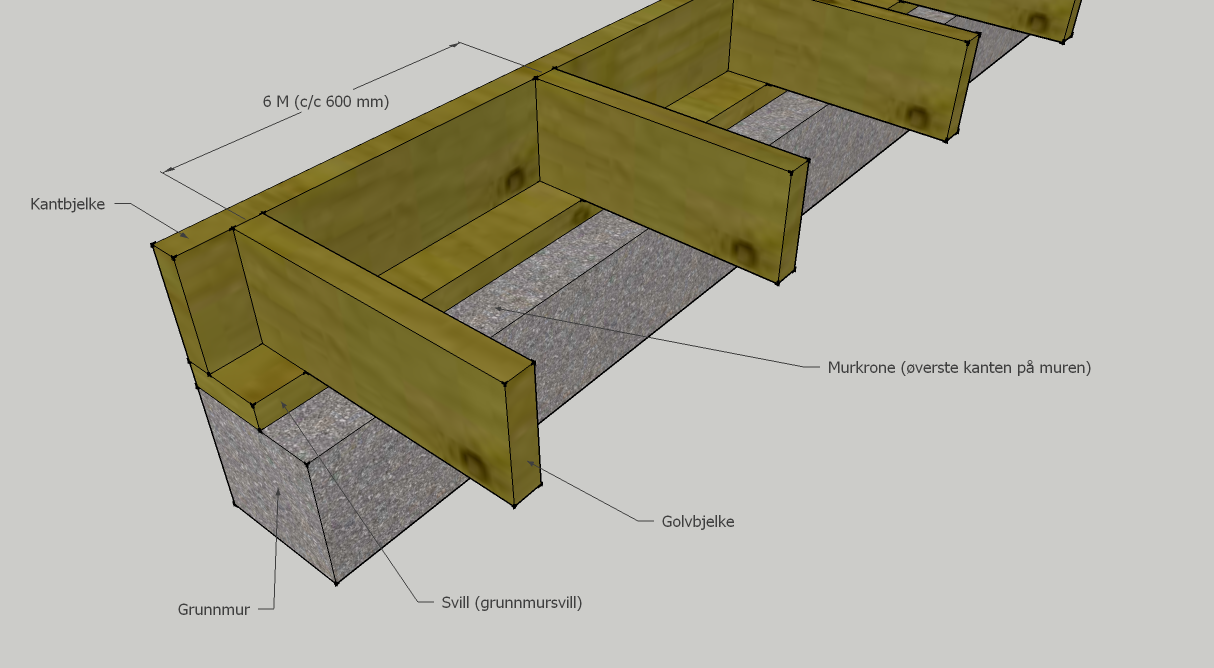
Cross section of a wooden joist layer, where "6 M" (or "6 modules") indicates a distance of 600 mm" (from center to center).

ISO 2848 is based on multiples of 300 mm and 600 mm. As dimensions increase, preference is given to lengths which are multiples of 3, 6, 12, 15, 30 and 60 basic modules. For smaller dimensions, the submodular increments 1/4 M and 1/2 M are preferred.

The numbers 300 and 600 were chosen because they are preferred numbers due to their large number of divisors – any multiple can be evenly divided into 2, 3, 4, 5, 6, 10, 12, 15, 20, 25, 30, etc., making them easy to use in mental arithmetic. This system is known as "modular coordination".

A related standard is British Standard 6750.

=== Basic module ===
Basic module (metric)
- Unit system: ISO 21723:2019
- Unit of: Length
- Symbol: M

Conversions
| 1 M in ... | ... is equal to ... |
- millimeter: 100 mm
- decimeter: 1 dm
- inch: ≈3.937 in

Basic module (imperial)
- Unit system: ISO 21723:2019
- Unit of: Length
- Symbol: M

Conversions
| 1 M in ... | ... is equal to ... |
- inch: 4 in
- millimeter: 101.6 mm
- decimeter: 1.06 dm

The underlying unit of size given in ISO 2848 for modular coordination is the 'basic module'. The 'basic module' is represented in the standards by the letter M, and has two standard definitions. It is primarily defined as 100 mm (3.937 inches), with the proviso that in countries using imperial units it is defined as 4 inches (101.6 mm).
