= Iron pipe size =

Pipe-sizing standard

IPS markings on gas pipe awaiting installation

Iron pipe size (IPS or I.P.S.) is a pipe-sizing system based on the inside diameter (ID) of pipe. It was widely used from the early 19th century to the mid-20th century, and is still in use by some industries, including major PVC pipe manufacturers, as well as for some legacy drawings and equipment. It was primarily used in the United States and the United Kingdom. In the 1920s, the Copper Tube Size (CTS) standard was combined with the IPS standard.

During the IPS period, pipes were cast in halves and welded together, and pipe sizes referred to the inside diameters. The inside diameters under IPS were roughly the same as the more modern Ductile Iron Pipe Standard (DIPS) and Nominal Pipe Size (NPS) Standards, and some of the wall thicknesses were also retained with a different designator. In 1948, the DIPS came into effect, when greater control of a pipe's wall thickness was possible.

CTS diameter always specifies the outside diameter (OD) of a tube, where pipe diameter specifications only approximate the pipe inside diameter (ID) for sizes of 12 inch or less, and STD wall thickness. The IPS number (reference to an OD) is the same as the NPS number, but the schedules were limited to Standard Wall (STD), Extra Strong, (XS) and Double Extra Strong (XXS). STD is identical to Schedule 40 for NPS 1/8 to NPS 10, inclusive, and indicates 0.375" wall thickness for NPS 12 and larger. XS is identical to SCH 80 for NPS 1/8 to NPS 8, inclusive, and indicates 0.500" wall thickness for NPS 8 and larger. Different definitions exist for XXS, but it is generally thicker than schedule 160.

== See also ==
- Nominal Pipe Sizes
- Pipe sizes
- Standard dimension ratio
