= Real versus nominal value (metrology) =

Philosophical distinctions

The distinction between real value and nominal value occurs in many fields. In metrology, the nominal value of a physical quantity is a rounded or approximate value, useful as a guidance for the appropriate use of an object under consideration. (Note: It is opposed to other values of a quantity, such as the measured value, the true value, the conventional value, or the reference value.) From a philosophical viewpoint, nominal value represents an accepted condition, which is a goal or an approximation, as opposed to the real value, which is assumed always present.

== Measurement ==
In manufacturing, a nominal size, or trade size, is a size "in name only" used for identification. The nominal size may not match any dimension of the product, but within the domain of that product the nominal size may correspond to a large number of highly standardized dimensions and tolerances.

Nominal sizes may be well-standardized across an industry or may be proprietary to one manufacturer.

Applying the nominal size across domains requires understanding of the size systems in both areas; for example, someone wishing to select a drill bit to clear a "1/4-inch screw" may consult tables to show the proper drill bit size. Someone wishing to calculate the load capacity of a steel beam would have to consult tables to translate the nominal size of the beam into usable dimensions.

When considering the engineering tolerance between a shaft (or bolt) going through a hole in some other part (such as a nut), both the shaft (or bolt) have the same nominal size (also called the basic size), but all the holes are physically larger and all the shafts are physically smaller in order that any shaft (or bolt) of a given nominal size can fit into any hole of the same nominal size.

In measurement, a nominal value is often a value existing in name only; it is assigned as a convenient designation rather than calculated by data analysis or following usual rounding methods. The use of nominal values can be based on de facto standards or some technical standards.

All real measurements have some variation depending on the accuracy and precision of the test method and the measurement uncertainty. The use of reported values often involves engineering tolerances.

One way to consider this is that the real value often has the characteristics of an irrational number. In real-world measuring situations, improving the measurement technique will eventually begin yielding unpredictable least significant digits. For example, a 1-inch long gauge block will measure to be exactly 1 inch long until the measuring techniques reach a certain degree of precision. As techniques improve beyond this threshold, it will become clear that 1 inch is not the real value of the gauge block length, but some other number approximates it.

== Examples ==
In various subfields of engineering, a nominal value is one for which the "name" for the value is close to, but not the same as, the actual value. Some examples:

- Dimensional lumber sizes such as "2 by 4" refers to a board whose finished dimensions are closer to 1 1/2 inches by 3 1/2 inches (1 3/4 inches by 3 3/4 inches is typical in the United Kingdom).
- A "3 1/2-inch" floppy disk's standard dimension is 90 mm, or 3.54 inches, and is advertised to hold "1.44 megabytes" although its capacity is 1,474,560 bytes (1.47456 MB).
- A "3/4-inch pipe" in the Nominal Pipe Size system has no dimensions that are exactly 0.75 inches.
- A screw thread has a number of dimensions required to assure proper function but is referred to by a nominal size and a thread design family, for example "1/4 inch, 20 threads per inch, Unified National Coarse."

In the United Kingdom, pipe is available that is quoted in both metric size and imperial size. The metric size is larger than the imperial size. For example, both 1/2 inch and 15 millimetres (0.59 in) copper pipe is actually the same pipe which has a nominal internal diameter of 1/2 an inch and a nominal external diameter of 15 millimetres (diameter is always internal in the imperial measurement system and always external in metric).

A machine is designed to operate at some particular condition, often stated on the device's nameplate. For example, a pump is designed to deliver its nominal pressure and flow while operating at its nominal speed and power. Actual operating conditions may vary.

- Electricity:
  - Mains electricity is nominally 230 V in the European Union, but is allowed to vary ±10%. In North America, the nominal voltage is 120 V, with variance allowed from 114 V to 126 V (±5%). Voltage is also supplied at 208 V, 240 V and 480 V with similar tolerances. In general, electrical devices are designed to work with one nominal voltage, which represents a band of possible actual voltages, power factor and AC waveform shapes.
  - Traction power networks routinely operate well above the nominal voltage, but still within the tolerance. For example, a streetcar traction power could be rated 600 ±10% volts nominal, but the actual overhead line voltage would normally be close to 660 volts, only dropping near the nominal value in exceptional conditions.
  - NiMH and NiCd rechargeable batteries have a nominal voltage of 1.2 V, but will actually supply real voltages ranging from about 1.45 V to 1.0 V during discharge.
  - A solar panel designed to charge a "12 V lead–acid battery" will often be called a "12-volt panel", even though the actual voltage while charging (of both the panel and the battery) is around 14 V, and the open-circuit voltage of the solar panel is around 17 V.

Other cases involve diameter, speed, and volume.

Sometimes the word "nominal" is misused in engineering contexts as a synonym for "normal" or "expected"; for example, The rotor resistances on all the other operating wheels are nominal.

== See also ==
- Caliber
- Conversion of units
- Metrology
- Nominal impedance
- Paper size
- Preferred number
- Significant figures
- Trade gallon
- US standard clothing size
