= Trade gallon =

Horticultural unit of volume

A trade gallon is a unit of volume for standard plant containers in the horticultural industries. It equals 3 US liquid quarts or 0.75 US gallons (2.8 L; 0.62 imp gal), although some sources state that a trade gallon equals 2.7 litres (0.71 US gal).

Notably, 10 trade gallons equals 30 US quarts, which in turn equals 1.0 cubic foot, a common unit of measurement for soil.
