= Preferred number =

Selection constraint in industrial design

In industrial design, preferred numbers (also called preferred values or preferred series) are standard guidelines for choosing exact product dimensions within a given set of constraints. Product developers must choose numerous lengths, distances, diameters, volumes, and other characteristic quantities. While all of these choices are constrained by considerations of functionality, usability, compatibility, safety, or cost, there usually remains considerable leeway in the exact choice for many dimensions.

Preferred numbers serve two purposes:

1. Using them increases the probability of compatibility between objects designed at different times by different people. In other words, it is one tactic among many in standardization, whether within a company or within an industry, and it is usually desirable in industrial contexts (unless the goal is vendor lock-in or planned obsolescence).
2. They are chosen such that when a product is manufactured in many different sizes, these will end up roughly equally spaced on a logarithmic scale. They therefore help to minimize the number of different sizes that need to be manufactured or kept in stock.

Preferred numbers represent preferences of simple numbers (such as 1, 2, and 5) multiplied by the powers of a convenient basis, usually 10.

Comparison of preferred numbers of the 1-2-5, Renard, and f-stop series on a logarithmic scale divided into 40 equal intervals (blue)

== Renard numbers ==
In 1870 Charles Renard proposed a set of preferred numbers. His system was adopted in 1952 as international standard ISO 3. Renard's system divides the interval from 1 to 10 into 5, 10, 20, or 40 steps, leading to the R5, R10, R20, and R40 scales, respectively. The factor between two consecutive numbers in a Renard series is approximately constant (before rounding), namely the 5th, 10th, 20th, or 40th root of 10 (approximately 1.58, 1.26, 1.12, and 1.06, respectively), which leads to a geometric sequence. This way, the maximum relative error is minimized if an arbitrary number is replaced by the nearest Renard number multiplied by the appropriate power of 10. Example: 1.0, 1.6, 2.5, 4.0, 6.3

== E series ==
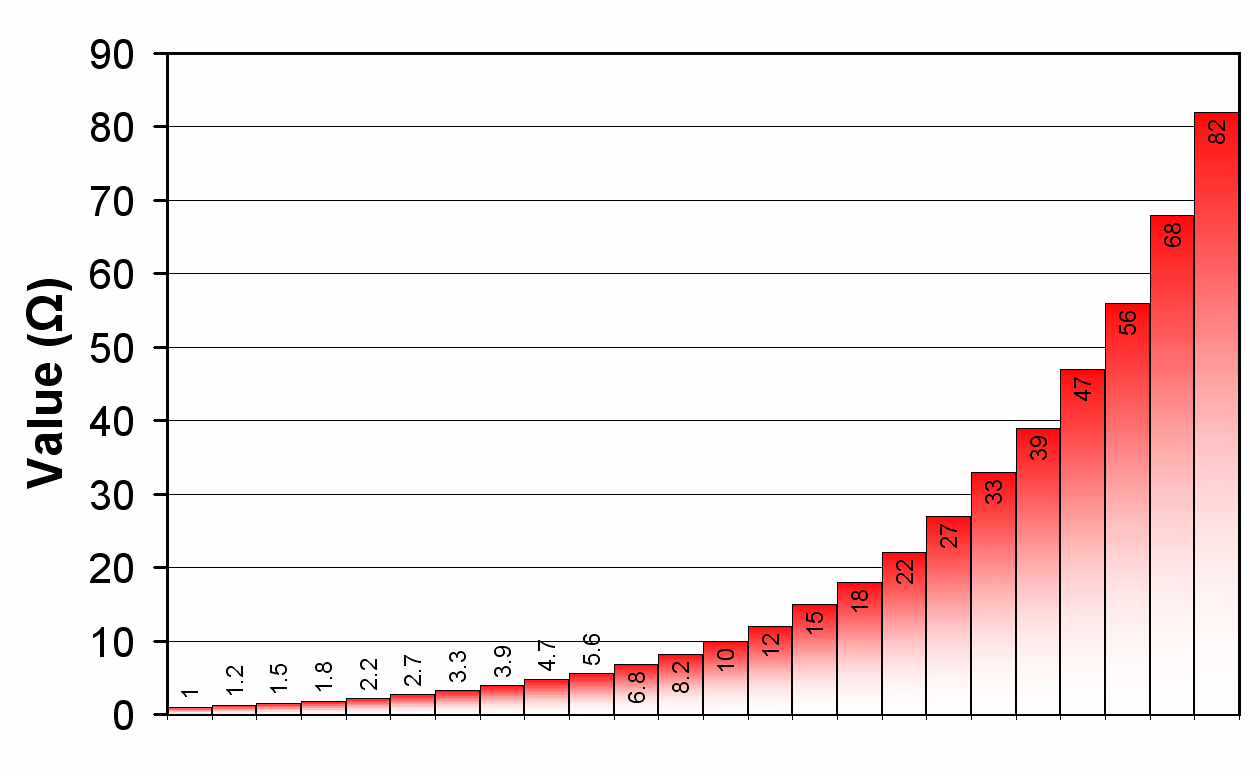
Graph of two decades of E12 series resistor values, which gives resistor values from 1 to 82 ohms (Ω)

The E series is another system of preferred numbers. It consists of the E1, E3, E6, E12, E24, E48, E96, and E192 series. Based on some of the existing manufacturing conventions, the International Electrotechnical Commission (IEC) began work on a new international standard in 1948. The first version of this IEC 63 (renamed into IEC 60063 in 2007) was released in 1952.

It works similarly to the Renard series, except that it subdivides the interval from 1 to 10 into 3, 6, 12, 24, 48, 96, or 192 steps. These subdivisions ensure that when some arbitrary value is replaced with the nearest preferred number, the maximum relative error will be on the order of 40%, 20%, 10%, 5%, etc.

Use of the E series is mostly restricted to the parameters of electronic components like resistors, capacitors, inductors, and Zener diodes. Commonly produced dimensions for other types of electrical components are either chosen from the Renard series instead or are defined in relevant product standards (for example wires).

== 1–2–5 series ==
In applications for which the R5 series provides a too fine graduation, the 1–2–5 series is sometimes used as a cruder alternative. It is effectively an E3 series rounded to one significant digit:

... 0.1 0.2 0.5 1 2 5 10 20 50 100 200 500 1000 ...

This series covers a decade (1:10 ratio) in three steps. Adjacent values differ by factors 2 or 2.5. Unlike the Renard series, the 1–2–5 series has not been formally adopted as an international standard. However, the Renard series R10 can be used to extend the 1–2–5 series to a finer graduation.

This series is used to define the scales for graphs and for instruments that display in a two-dimensional form with a graticule, such as oscilloscopes.

The denominations of most modern currencies, notably the euro and sterling, follow a 1–2–5 series. The United States and Canada follow the approximate 1–2–5 series 1, 5, 10, 25, 50 (cents), $1, $2, $5, $10, $20, $50, $100. The 1/4–1/2–1 series (... 0.1 0.25 0.5 1 2.5 5 10 ...) is also used by currencies derived from the former Dutch guilder (Aruban florin, Netherlands Antillean guilder, Surinamese dollar), some Middle Eastern currencies (the Iraqi dinar, Jordanian dinar, Lebanese pound, Syrian pound), and the Seychellois rupee. However, newer notes introduced in Lebanon and Syria due to inflation follow the standard 1–2–5 series instead.

== Convenient numbers ==
In the 1970s the National Bureau of Standards (NBS) defined a set of convenient numbers to ease metrication in the United States. This system of metric values was described as 1–2–5 series in reverse, with assigned preferences for those numbers which are multiples of 5, 2, and 1 (plus their powers of 10), excluding linear dimensions above 100 mm.

== Audio frequencies ==
ISO 266, Acoustics—Preferred frequencies, defines two different series of audio frequencies for use in acoustical measurements. Both series are referred to the standard reference frequency of 1000 Hz, and use the R10 Renard series from ISO 3, with one using powers of 10, and the other related to the definition of the octave as the frequency ratio 1:2.

For example, a set of nominal center frequencies for third-octave bands used in audio tests and audio test equipment is: 20, 25, 31.5, 40, 50, 63, 80, 100, 125, 160, 200, 250, 315, 400, 500, 630, 800, 1000, 1250, 1600, 2000, 2500, 3150, 4000, 5000, 6300, 8000, 10000, 12500, 16000, 20000 Hz.

== Computer engineering ==
When dimensioning computer components, the powers of two are frequently used as preferred numbers:

 1    2    4    8   16   32   64  128  256  512  1024 ...

Where a finer grading is needed, additional preferred numbers are obtained by multiplying a power of two with a small odd integer:

     1  2   4   8   16    32    64    128   256    512    1024 ...
(×3) 3  6   12  24  48    96    192   384   768    1536   3072 ...
(×5) 5  10  20  40  80    160   320   640   1280   2560   5120 ...
(×7) 7  14  28  56  112   224   448   896   1792   3584   7168 ...

Preferred aspect ratios
| num. den. | 16: | 15: | 12: |
|---|---|---|---|
| :8 | 2:1 | | 3:2 |
| :9 | 16:9 | 5:3 | 4:3 |
| :10 | 8:5 | 3:2 | |
| :12 | 4:3 | 5:4 | 1:1 |

In computer graphics, widths and heights of raster images are preferred to be multiples of 16, as many compression algorithms (JPEG, MPEG) divide color images into square blocks of that size. All JPEG images are divided into 8×8 blocks. Screen resolutions often follow the same principle. Preferred aspect ratios have also an important influence here, e.g., 2:1, 3:2, 4:3, 5:3, 5:4, 8:5, 16:9.

== Paper documents, envelopes, and drawing pens ==
Standard metric paper sizes use the square root of two (√2) as factors between neighbouring dimensions rounded to the nearest mm (Lichtenberg series, ISO 216). An A4 sheet for example has an aspect ratio very close to √2 and an area very close to 1/16 square metre. An A5 is almost exactly half an A4, and has the same aspect ratio. The √2 factor also appears between the standard pen thicknesses for technical drawings in ISO 9175-1: 0.13, 0.18, 0.25, 0.35, 0.50, 0.70, 1.00, 1.40, and 2.00 mm. This way, the right pen size is available to continue a drawing that has been magnified to a different standard paper size.

== Photography ==
In photography, aperture, exposure, and film speed generally follow powers of 2:

The aperture size controls how much light enters the camera. It is measured in f-stops: f/1.4, f/2, f/2.8, f/4, etc. Full f-stops are a square root of 2 apart. Camera lens settings are often set to gaps of successive thirds, so each f-stop is a sixth root of 2, rounded to two significant digits: 1.0, 1.1, 1.2, 1.4, 1.6, 1.8, 2.0, 2.2, 2.5, 2.8, 3.2, 3.5, 4.0, etc. The spacing is referred to as "one-third of a stop". (The rounding is deliberately incorrect in the cases of f/1.2, f/3.5, f/5.6, f/22, etc.)

The film speed is a measure of the film's sensitivity to light. It is expressed as ISO values such as "ISO 100". An earlier standard, occasionally still in use, uses the term "ASA" rather than "ISO", referring to the (former) American Standards Association. Measured film speeds are rounded to the nearest preferred number from a modified Renard series including 100, 125, 160, 200, 250, 320, 400, 500, 640, 800, ... This is the same as the R10′ rounded Renard series, except for the use of 6.4 instead of 6.3, and for having more aggressive rounding below ISO 16. Film marketed to amateurs, however, uses a restricted series including only powers of two multiples of ISO 100: 25, 50, 100, 200, 400, 800, 1600, and 3200. Some low-end cameras can only reliably read these values from DX encoded film cartridges because they lack the extra electrical contacts that would be needed to read the complete series. Some digital cameras extend this binary series to values like 12800, 25600, etc. instead of the modified Renard values 12500, 25000, etc.

The shutter speed controls how long the camera lens is open to receive light. These are expressed as fractions of a second, roughly but not exactly based on powers of 2: 1 second, 1/2, 1/4, 1/8, 1/15, 1/30, 1/60, 1/125, 1/250, 1/500, 1/1000 of a second.

== Retail packaging ==
In some countries, consumer-protection laws restrict the number of different prepackaged sizes in which certain products can be sold, in order to make it easier for consumers to compare prices.

An example of such a regulation is the European Union directive on the volume of certain prepackaged liquids (75/106/EEC). It restricts the list of allowed wine-bottle sizes to 0.1, 0.25 (1/4), 0.375 (3/8), 0.5 (1/2), 0.75 (3/4), 1, 1.5, 2, 3, and 5 litres. Similar lists exist for several other types of products. They vary and often deviate significantly from any geometric series in order to accommodate traditional sizes when feasible. Adjacent package sizes in these lists differ typically by factors 2/3 or 3/4, in some cases even 1/2, 4/5, or some other ratio of two small integers.

== See also ==
- Convenient number
- Nominal impedance
- Real versus nominal value (metrology)
- Preferred metric sizes
