= Standard dimension ratio =

Method of rating a pipe's durability against pressure

Standard dimension ratio (SDR) is a method of rating a pipe's durability against pressure. The standard dimension ratio describes the correlation between the pipe dimension and the thickness of the pipe wall.

Common nominations are SDR11, SDR17, SDR26 and SDR35. Pipes with a lower SDR can withstand higher pressures.

$SDR=\frac{d_o}{s}$

$d_o$ Pipe outside diameter

$s$ Pipe wall thickness
