= Thread angle =

Angle between flanks of a screw thread

Diagram of a thread angle

In mechanical engineering, the thread angle of a screw is the included angle between the thread flanks, measured in a plane containing the thread axis. This is a defining factor for the shape of a screw thread. Standard values include:

Name	Code	Angle	Profile	Standards
Most V-threads	M	60°		including DIN 13 / ISO, NPT and UTS
Whitworth threads	W	55°		DIN 49301 / BS
British standard pipe thread	G	55°		DIN / BS / EN / ISO 228-1 / ISO 7-1
National Pipe Thread	NPT	60°		ASME B1.20.-1983 Pipe Threads, General Purpose, Inch
Knuckle thread; Round thread	Rd	30°		DIN 405 / DIN 20400
Acme thread		29°		ASME/ANSI B1.5-1988
Metric trapezoidal threads	Tr	30°		DIN 103
Buttress threads	S	45°		DIN 2781
German buttress threads	S	30°		DIN 513
Square threads	Sq	0° (parallel)		?
Panzergewinde, "steel conduit thread"	Pg	80°		DIN 40430
British Association (BA) thread	BA	47° 30' = 47.5°		BS 93:2008
Löwenherz thread		53° 8' ≈ 53.1°		
Bodmer thread		50°		
Thury thread		47° 30' = 47.5°		
