= British Standard Brass =

British Standard Brass or British Brass Thread is an imperial unit based screw thread. It adopts the Whitworth thread form with a pitch of 26 threads per inch and a thread angle of 55 degrees for all diameters. It is often wrongly called British Standard Brass but is not actually covered by a British Standard.

The reason for adopting 26 tpi, is brass tube has a relatively similar wall thickness irrespective of the outside diameter of the tube, therefore as BSW thread depths are determined by the threads per inch, a lower tpi would reduce the strength of the tube or cut right through it. Brass tube threads can be confused with the British Standard Cycle thread, one of which that is most common is also 26 tpi. The difference being the thread angle of the British Standard Cycle is the same as the metric thread angle of 60 degrees.

Nominal sizes are usually in the range 1/8 to 2 inches.

== See also ==
- British Standard Pipe (BSP)
- British Standard Whitworth
- National pipe thread (NPT)
- Unified Thread Standard (UTS, including UNC, UNF and UNEF)
