= Shadowgraphy =

Shadowgraphy may refer to:

- Shadowgraphy (performing art), using hand shadows
- Shadow play or shadow puppetry, performing art using cut-out figures
- Radiography, the use of X-rays
- Shadowgraph or shadowgram, an optical method that reveals non-uniformities in transparent media
- Optical comparator, a device that creates silhouettes of manufactured parts for inspection
- Shadowgraph, an electromagnetic and optical device once used as an alternative to magic eye tube
