= British Association screw threads =

Set of helical screw threads

British Association screw threads, or BA screw threads, are a set of small screw threads, the largest being 0BA at 6 mm diameter. They were, and to some extent still are, used for miniature instruments and modelling.

They are unusual in that they were probably the most "scientific" design of screw, starting with 0BA at 6.0 mm diameter and 1.0 mm pitch and progressing in a geometric sequence where each larger number was 0.9 times the pitch of the last size. They then rounded to 2 significant figures in metric and then converting to inches and rounding to the thousandth of an inch. This anticipated worldwide metrication by about a century. The design was first proposed by the British Science Association in 1884 with a thread angle and depth based on the Swiss Thury thread, it was adopted by the Association in 1903.

The Thury thread was different in that it went both positive and negative all the way up to a size of −20 which was 75.2 mm diameter by 8.23 mm pitch (p). The Thury numbers were rounded to three significant figures. The Thury thread form had the crests rounded at 1/6p and the roots rounded at 1/5p so the thread angle was close to 47.5° but not exactly. This was simplified in the BA thread definition by defining the thread angle to be 47.5° exactly and the thread form to be symmetrical with a depth of 3/5p.

The British Standards Institution recommends the use of BA sizes in favour of the smaller British Standard Whitworth (BSW) and British Standard Fine (BSF) thread screws (those below 1/4 inch). Generally, the 0BA size was dropped in place of 7/32 inch BSF in assemblies that included larger fasteners, however, in smaller equipment that was primarily electronic/electrical the 0BA size would typically be used in place of the BSF or BSW screw where it was the largest size required.

BA threads are still used in some precision instruments, such as optics and moving-coil meters, relays etc. A 2BA thread is used to connect the metal barrel of a dart to its shaft — as such, it is one of the few common uses of this thread in North America.

In the UK, 2BA threads are commonly found in the old imperial British Engineering Standards Association (BESA) conduit boxes, and 4BA threads in light switch and socket back boxes which are still in use (but not installed) today.

== BA thread sizes ==
The pitch of 0BA is 1 mm and the pitch of each higher numbered thread is obtained by multiplying the pitch of the lower number by 0.9 so K-BA has a pitch of p = 0.9^{K} rounded to two significant figures in mm. The major diameter is given by 6p^{1.2}, rounded to two significant figures in mm and the hex head size (across the flats) is 1.75 times the major diameter.

BA sizes are specified by the following British Standards:

- BS 57:1951 — B.A. screws, bolts and nuts
- BS 93:1951 — Specification for British Association (B.A.) screw threads with tolerances for sizes 0 B.A. to 16 B.A.
- BS 93:2008 — British Association (B.A.) screw threads — Requirements

The angle of the thread is 47.5° and the depth of thread is 0.6 times the pitch with rounded tops and bottoms. Thus, the shortening at the crest and root is given by 0.26817p with a radius of 0.18083p at both crest and root. The 1884 report specifies a radius of 2/11p ≈ 0.181818p but this was an approximation to the correct value.

The pitch diameter of the thread is simply OD − 0.6p and the minor diameter is OD − 1.2p.

The thread angle is different from that used by Whitworth (55°), US Unified threads (60°) and ISO Metric (60°) so BA fasteners are not properly interchangeable with Whitworth or metric ones even when the pitch and diameter are similar enough that they can be screwed together (e.g., although 0BA appears similar to M6×1mm, the male and female surfaces do not mate properly for bearing a load). Standard BA sizes are defined between 0BA and 22BA. The even sizes are much more common and the very small sizes are not used very often and other standards tend to be used (e.g., Norm Horlogere Suisse).

BA	Thread pitch	Outside diameter	Threads density	Outside diameter	Spanner	
BA	(mm)	(mm)	(tpi)	(in)	(mm)	(in)
0	1.00	6.00	25.40	0.2362	10.5000	0.4134
1	0.90	5.30	28.22	0.2087	9.2750	0.3652
2	0.81	4.70	31.36	0.1850	8.2250	0.3238
3	0.73	4.10	34.79	0.1614	7.1750	0.2825
4	0.66	3.60	38.48	0.1417	6.3000	0.2480
5	0.59	3.20	43.05	0.1260	5.6000	0.2205
6	0.53	2.80	47.92	0.1102	4.9000	0.1929
7	0.48	2.50	52.92	0.0984	4.3750	0.1722
8	0.43	2.20	59.07	0.0866	3.8500	0.1516
9	0.39	1.90	65.13	0.0748	3.3250	0.1309
10	0.35	1.70	72.57	0.0669	2.9750	0.1171
⋮
25	0.072	0.25	352.78	0.0098	0.4375	0.0172

== See also ==
- Thury thread
