= British Standard Pipe =

Standard set of screw thread sizes used in pipe fittings

British Standard Pipe (BSP) is a set of technical standards for screw threads that has been adopted internationally for interconnecting and sealing pipes and fittings by mating an external (male) thread with an internal (female) thread. It has been adopted as standard in plumbing and pipe fitting, except in North America, where NPT and related threads are used.

== Types ==
BSPP fitting

Two types of threads are distinguished:

- Parallel (straight) threads, British Standard Pipe Parallel thread (BSPP; originally also known as British Standard Pipe Fitting thread/BSPF and British Standard Pipe Mechanical thread/BSPM), which have a constant diameter; denoted by the letter G.
- Taper threads, British Standard Pipe Taper thread (BSPT), whose diameter increases or decreases along the length of the thread; denoted by the letter R.

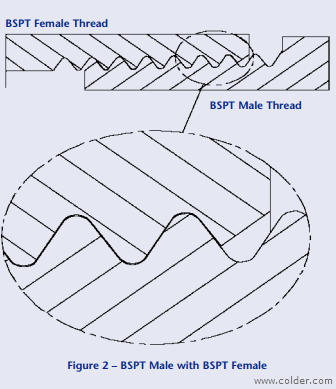
BSPT threads

These can be combined into two types of joints:

Jointing threads
These are pipe threads where pressure-tightness is made through the mating of two threads together. They always use a taper male thread, but can have either parallel or taper female threads. (In Europe, taper female pipe threads are not commonly used.)
Longscrew threads
These are parallel pipe threads used where a pressure-tight joint is achieved by the compression of a soft material (such as an o-ring seal or a washer) between the end face of the male thread and a socket or nipple face, with the tightening of a backnut.

== Thread form ==
The thread form follows the British Standard Whitworth standard:

- Symmetrical V-thread in which the angle between the flanks is 55° (measured in an axial plane)
- One-sixth of this sharp V is truncated at the top and the bottom
- The threads are rounded equally at crests and roots by circular arcs ending tangentially with the flanks where r ≈ 0.1373P
- The theoretical depth of the thread is therefore 0.6403 times the nominal pitch h ≈ 0.6403P

== Pipe thread sizes ==
At least 41 thread sizes have been defined, ranging from ^{1}/_{16} to 18, although of these only 15 are included in ISO 7 and 24 in ISO 228. The size number was originally based on the inner diameter (measured in inches) of a steel tube for which the thread was intended, but contemporary pipes tend to use thinner walls to save material, and thus have an inner diameter larger than this nominal size. In the modern standard metric version, it is simply a size number, where listed diameter size is the major outer diameter of the external thread. For a taper thread, it is the diameter at the "gauge length" (plus/minus one thread pitch) from the small end of the thread. The taper is 1:16, meaning that for each 16 units of measurement increase in the distance from the end, the diameter increases by 1 unit of measurement.

| G / R size | Thread density (TPI) | Thread pitch | Major diameter | | Minor diameter | | Gauge length | | Tapping drill | |
| G / R size | Thread density (TPI) | Thread pitch | Major diameter | | Minor diameter | | Gauge length | | R 95% | G 80% |
| (in) | (in^{−1}) | (mm) | (in) | (mm) | (in) | (mm) | (in) | (mm) | (mm) | (mm) |
|---|---|---|---|---|---|---|---|---|---|---|
| 1/16 | 28 | 0.907 | 0.3041 | 7.723 | 0.2583 | 6.561 | 5/32 | 4.0 | 6.6 | 6.8 |
| 1/8 | 28 | 0.907 | 0.3830 | 9.728 | 0.3372 | 8.566 | 5/32 | 4.0 | 8.6 | 8.8 |
| 1/4 | 19 | 1.337 | 0.5180 | 13.157 | 0.4506 | 11.445 | 0.2367 | 6.0 | 11.5 | 11.8 |
| 3/8 | 19 | 1.337 | 0.6560 | 16.662 | 0.5886 | 14.950 | 1/4 | 6.4 | 15.0 | 15.3 |
| 1/2 | 14 | 1.814 | 0.8250 | 20.955 | 0.7335 | 18.631 | 0.3214 | 8.2 | 18.7 | 19.1 |
| 5/8 | 14 | 1.814 | 0.9020 | 22.911 | 0.8105 | 20.587 | 0.3214 | 8.2 | 20.7 | 21.1 |
| 3/4 | 14 | 1.814 | 1.0410 | 26.441 | 0.9495 | 24.117 | 3/8 | 9.5 | 24.2 | 24.6 |
| 7/8 | 14 | 1.814 | 1.1890 | 30.201 | 1.0975 | 27.877 | 3/8 | 9.5 | 28.0 | 28.3 |
| 1 | 11 | 2.309 | 1.3090 | 33.249 | 1.1926 | 30.291 | 0.4091 | 10.4 | 30.4 | 30.9 |
| 1 1/8 | 11 | 2.309 | 1.4920 | 37.897 | 1.3756 | 34.939 | 0.4091 | 10.4 | 35.1 | 35.5 |
| 1 1/4 | 11 | 2.309 | 1.6500 | 41.910 | 1.5335 | 38.952 | 1/2 | 12.7 | 39.1 | 39.5 |
| 1 3/8 | 11 | 2.309 | 1.7450 | 44.323 | 1.6285 | 41.365 | 1/2 | 12.7 | 41.5 | 42.0 |
| 1 1/2 | 11 | 2.309 | 1.8820 | 47.803 | 1.7656 | 44.845 | 1/2 | 12.7 | 45.0 | 45.4 |
| 1 5/8 | 11 | 2.309 | 2.0820 | 52.883 | 1.9656 | 49.926 | 5/8 | 15.9 | 50.1 | 50.5 |
| 1 3/4 | 11 | 2.309 | 2.1160 | 53.746 | 1.9995 | 50.788 | 5/8 | 15.9 | 50.9 | 51.4 |
| 1 7/8 | 11 | 2.309 | 2.2440 | 56.998 | 2.1276 | 54.041 | 5/8 | 15.9 | 54.2 | 54.6 |
| 2 | 11 | 2.309 | 2.3470 | 59.614 | 2.2306 | 56.656 | 5/8 | 15.9 | 56.8 | 57.2 |
| 2 1/4 | 11 | 2.309 | 2.5870 | 65.710 | 2.4706 | 62.752 | 11/16 | 17.5 | 62.9 | 63.3 |
| 2 1/2 | 11 | 2.309 | 2.9600 | 75.184 | 2.8435 | 72.226 | 11/16 | 17.5 | 72.4 | 72.8 |
| 2 3/4 | 11 | 2.309 | 3.2100 | 81.534 | 3.0935 | 78.576 | 13/16 | 20.6 | 78.7 | 79.2 |
| 3 | 11 | 2.309 | 3.4600 | 87.884 | 3.3435 | 84.926 | 13/16 | 20.6 | 85.1 | 85.5 |
| 3 1/4 | 11 | 2.309 | 3.7000 | 93.980 | 3.5835 | 91.022 | 7/8 | 22.2 | 91.2 | 91.6 |
| 3 1/2 | 11 | 2.309 | 3.9500 | 100.330 | 3.8335 | 97.372 | 7/8 | 22.2 | 97.5 | 98.0 |
| 3 3/4 | 11 | 2.309 | 4.2000 | 106.680 | 4.0835 | 103.722 | 7/8 | 22.2 | 103.9 | 104.3 |
| 4 | 11 | 2.309 | 4.4500 | 113.030 | 4.3335 | 110.072 | 1 | 25.4 | 110.2 | 110.7 |
| 4 1/2 | 11 | 2.309 | 4.9500 | 125.730 | 4.8335 | 122.772 | 1 | 25.4 | 122.9 | 123.4 |
| 5 | 11 | 2.309 | 5.4500 | 138.430 | 5.3335 | 135.472 | 1 1/8 | 28.6 | 135.6 | 136.1 |
| 5 1/2 | 11 | 2.309 | 5.9500 | 151.130 | 5.8335 | 148.172 | 1 1/8 | 28.6 | 148.3 | 148.8 |
| 6 | 11 | 2.309 | 6.4500 | 163.830 | 6.3335 | 160.872 | 1 1/8 | 28.6 | 161.0 | 161.5 |
| 7 | 10 | 2.540 | 7.4500 | 189.230 | 7.3220 | 185.979 | 1 3/8 | 34.9 | 186.1 | 186.6 |
| 8 | 10 | 2.540 | 8.4500 | 214.630 | 8.3220 | 211.379 | 1 1/2 | 38.1 | 211.5 | 212.0 |
| 9 | 10 | 2.540 | 9.4500 | 240.030 | 9.3220 | 236.779 | 1 1/2 | 38.1 | 236.9 | 237.4 |
| 10 | 10 | 2.540 | 10.4500 | 265.430 | 10.3220 | 262.179 | 1 5/8 | 41.3 | 262.3 | 262.8 |
| 11 | 8 | 3.175 | 11.4500 | 290.830 | 11.2900 | 286.766 | 1 5/8 | 41.3 | 287.0 | 287.6 |
| 12 | 8 | 3.175 | 12.4500 | 316.230 | 12.2900 | 312.166 | 1 5/8 | 41.3 | 312.4 | 313.0 |
| 13 | 8 | 3.175 | 13.6800 | 347.472 | 13.5200 | 343.408 | 1 5/8 | 41.3 | 343.6 | 344.2 |
| 14 | 8 | 3.175 | 14.6800 | 372.872 | 14.5200 | 368.808 | 1 3/4 | 44.5 | 369.0 | 369.6 |
| 15 | 8 | 3.175 | 15.6800 | 398.272 | 15.5200 | 394.208 | 1 3/4 | 44.5 | 394.4 | 395.0 |
| 16 | 8 | 3.175 | 16.6800 | 423.672 | 16.5200 | 419.608 | 1 7/8 | 47.6 | 419.8 | 420.4 |
| 17 | 8 | 3.175 | 17.6800 | 449.072 | 17.5200 | 445.008 | 2 | 50.8 | 445.2 | 445.8 |
| 18 | 8 | 3.175 | 18.6800 | 474.472 | 18.5200 | 470.408 | 2 | 50.8 | 470.6 | 471.2 |

These standard pipe threads are formally referred to by the following sequence of blocks:

- the words, Pipe thread,
- the document number of the standard (e.g., ISO 7 or EN 10226)
- the symbol for the pipe thread type:
  - G, external and internal parallel (ISO 228)
  - R, external taper (ISO 7)
  - Rp, internal parallel (ISO 7/1)
  - Rc, internal taper (ISO 7)
  - Rs, external parallel
- the thread size

Threads are normally right-hand. For left-hand threads, the letters, LH, are appended.

Example: Pipe thread EN 10226 Rp 2 1/2

The terminology for the use of G and R originated from Germany (G for gas, as it was originally designed for use on gas pipes; R for rohr, meaning pipe.)

== Pipe and fastener dimensions ==
| G / R size | Typ. nut sizes | Corresponding pipe | | |
| G / R size | Typ. nut sizes | DN | OD | Wall |
| (in) | (mm) | (mm) | (mm) | (mm) |
|---|---|---|---|---|
| 1/16 | | 3 | | |
| 1/8 | 15 | 6 | 10.2 | 2 |
| 1/4 | 19 | 8 | 13.5 | 2.3 |
| 3/8 | 22 or 23 | 10 | 17.2 | 2.3 |
| 1/2 | 27 | 15 | 21.3 | 2.6 |
| 3/4 | 32 | 20 | 26.9 | 2.6 |
| 1 | 43 | 25 | 33.7 | 3.2 |
| 1 1/4 | 53 | 32 | 42.4 | 3.2 |
| 1 1/2 | 57 | 40 | 48.3 | 3.2 |
| 2 | 70 | 50 | 60.3 | 3.6 |
| 2 1/2 | | 65 | 76.1 | 3.6 |
| 3 | | 80 | 88.9 | 4 |
| 4 | | 100 | 114.3 | 4.5 |
| 5 | | 125 | 139.7 | 5 |
| 6 | | 150 | 168.3 | 5 |

== ISO 7 (pressure-tight threads) ==
The standard ISO 7 – Pipe threads where pressure-tight joints are made on the threads consists of the following parts:

- ISO 7-1:1994 Dimensions, tolerances and designation
- ISO 7-2:2000 Verification by means of limit gauges

== ISO 228 (non-pressure-tight threads) ==
The standard ISO 228 – Pipe threads where pressure-tight joints are not made on the threads consists of the following parts:

- ISO 228-1:2000 Dimensions, tolerances and designation
- ISO 228-2:1987 Verification by means of limit gauges

== See also ==
- AN thread
- British standard brass thread
- British Standard Whitworth
- Garden hose thread
- National pipe thread
- Panzergewinde
- Thread angle
- Threaded pipe

| Preceded by ISO 6 | Lists of ISOs; ISO 7 | Succeeded by ISO 8 |
