= Thury thread =

Metric screw thread standard

The Swiss-designed Thury screw thread (alternatively called the Filière Suisse, FS, screw thread) is a metric thread standard that was developed in the late nineteenth century for screws used in scientific and horological instruments. The thread is named after Marc Thury, an engineer and professor at the University of Geneva who contributed heavily to the standard's development.

== History ==
Development of the Thury thread began in 1876, when the Horological Section of Geneva Society of Arts appointed a committee to look into the requirements for a uniform thread standard for use in Horological arts in Switzerland. Professor Thury began his studies by collecting and measuring samples of screws made by nine independent screw and screw tackle manufacturers in Switzerland. The Thury thread form was developed in 1878, thirty-seven years after the British Standard Whitworth thread form was designed in England and fourteen years after the United States Standard thread was presented in the United States. However, unlike these two predecessors, the Thury thread was designed for small-diameter screws which were then produced with screw plates. This production technique mandated that the Thury thread form have rounded crests and roots. Thread forms with rounded or "radiused" crests and roots like the Thury and Whitworth thread generate smaller stress risers than those forms like the American National or ISO metric which have truncated roots and crests; in modern engineering this is particularly important factor when tapping holes in acrylic plastic, where a larger stress riser can lead to an earlier onset of crack formation. The Thury thread is unusual in having a comparatively small 47.5° thread flank angle, which was chosen to make fabrication easier and to achieve greater holding capacity than screws with larger flank angles. Screws in the Thury thread system are given nominal sizes, with the base size "0" being six millimeters in diameter and having a thread pitch of one millimeter. Sizes are proportional, so a size "1" is ten percent smaller in diameter that a size "0", while a size −1 is ten percent larger than a size "0". The Thury thread was believed to be the first thread form to solve the problem of creating a single system of screw dimensions applicable to all sizes. The relationship between the pitch P of a Thury screw and its diameter D is expressed by the equation D = 6P^{6/5}. Another variable Thury standardized is the thread depth, which had until then been variable when cutting threads in different materials. The proliferation of the Thury standard was hindered when in 1882, the British Science Association produced a committee report on the consideration of a standard screw gauge, where they declined to accept the Thury thread but instead chose to use the Whitworth thread standard previously designed by committee member Joseph Whitworth, in part because the Whitworth form was historically successful and because the committee did not believe England was prepared to use a metric thread as its standard. However, the committee recognized the validity of many of the design aspects of the Thury thread, and a mere two years later published their specifications for the British Association (BA) thread. The BA committee made only slight modifications to the rounding radii of Thury thread and gave specifications rounded to the nearest thousandth of an inch.

== Obsolescence ==
Despite being popular screw standards for nearly a century, both the Thury thread and the BA thread have largely been replaced by the ISO Metric thread form. Today the Thury thread is rare outside of antiques due to the relative abundance of other standard sized fasteners. For example, the British Association 0BA, the Löwenherz 6 mm and ISO M6×1.0 fasteners have identical pitch and diameter to the Thury size 0 (however, they are not interchangeable because they differ in thread geometry).
