= British Standard Cycle =

British Imperial screw thread standard

British Standard Cycle (BSC or BSCy or CEI) is a British Imperial screw thread standard. Unlike other major British imperial thread standards (British Standard Whitworth and British Standard Fine) the thread runs at a 60 degrees rather than a 55 degrees angle. All sizes 1/4 inch and larger use 26 threads per inch (tpi), making them similar to 1 mm ISO threads, which are 25.4 per inch and also run at a 60 degrees angle. It was originally used with both bicycles and motorcycles. However it is now believed to be obsolete in motorcycle manufacture. In the bicycle industry it is still found on virtually all bottom bracket threads and the wheel axles of low-end models manufactured in China, which are derived from pre-WWII British roadsters.

BS 811: 1950 provides specifications for British standard cycle threads.

Cycle thread in 7/16 and 1/2 inch sizes also come in 20 tpi and 24 tpi options.

1/4" diameter cycle thread nuts and bolts have the same 26tpi as 1/4" BSF, which means that they will fit each other in this diameter only.

Traditionally the parts it would be found on are:

- Front axle and seat pin clamp bolt 5/16 inch (7.94 mm) diameter, 24 or 26 tpi threading
- Rear axle 3/8 inch (9.53 mm) diameter, 26 tpi
- GB Stems using 5/16 inch (7.94 mm) diameter, 26 tpi for the handlebar clamp

Note that M8 × 1.00 metric threaded parts can interchange with 5/16 inch (7.94 mm) diameter × 26 tpi parts with a "Class B fit", meaning you should not go back and forth between threadings.

British Bicycle standards for other parts which are not strictly BSC but come in similar fine threads include:

- Bottom Bracket cups diameter with a 24 tpi ISO standard or a 26 tpi Raleigh (now obsolete) standard

== History ==
The thread was defined to meet a requirement for a thread form for bicycles and motorcycles, originally specified by the Cycle Engineering Institute. Before being adopted as a British Standard it was known as the CEI thread.

== See also ==
- Raleigh Bicycle Company
