= Digital readout =

Numeric display reporting position of machinery

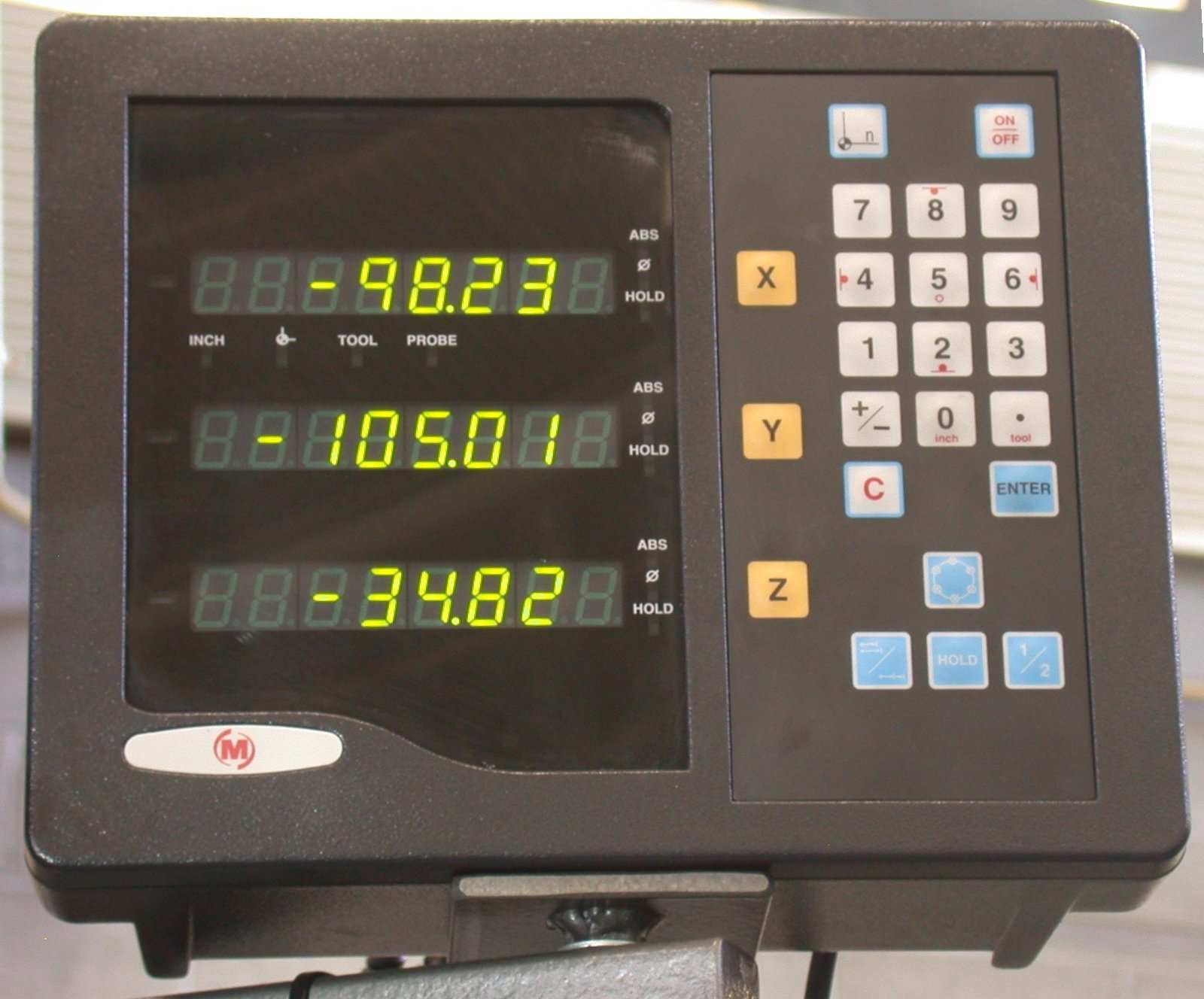
DRO providing a three axis display with pitch circle calculator, diameter/radius conversion, absolute and incremental toggle, and inch metric toggle

A digital readout (DRO) is a numeric display, usually with an integrated keyboard and some means of numeric representation. Its integral computer reads signals generated by linear encoders or (less frequently) rotary encoders installed to track machine axes, using these measures to keep track of and display to a machine operator the workpiece position (e.g., milling machines), or tool position (lathes, grinders, etc) in space.

In machine-shop terminology, the complete digital read-out system (consisting of a computer, axis-position encoders, and a numeric display) is referred to by the acronym DRO. Such a system is commonly fitted to machines in today's shops, especially for metal working — lathes, cylindrical grinders, milling machines, surface grinders, boring mills and other machine tools — to allow the operator to work faster and with greater accuracy. Use of DROs is not limited to manually operated machines. CNC machines can usually be switched to manual operation, and in this case a form of DRO is simulated on its control panel.

== Display unit (computer) ==
Several 7-segment displays, or an LCD screen on more expensive models display the position of each machine axis. Three-axis systems including the X, Y, Z axes are common on milling machines; those plus U and W are used on highly sophisticated 5-axis vertical machining centers. Lathes or cylindrical grinders typically use just X and Z axes, while a surface grinder may use only a Z axis.

=== Common standard functions on a DRO ===
DROs have a lot of functionality, providing computation of common operations. The following list was taken from the user manual of a digital readout manufacturer's product:

- Imperial (inch) and metric interchange.
- "1/2" function: takes the value of an axis and divides it by two, used to find the center of a workpiece.
- Preset dimensions: axis values can be entered directly, used to match measured value.
- Absolute or Incremental modes: position of a feature given on a blueprint is given by one of two methods:
  - Absolute: which means the coordinate is relative to the part's absolute zero (usually one of its corners or its center).
  - Relative: meaning the coordinate is referred to some other feature, usually the last one machined.
- Bolt holes: drilling or boring of several holes along an arc without using a rotary table.
- Inclines: compute a cut or series of holes across an incline or diagonal.
- Memory: stores hundreds or thousands of points.
- Calculator: a scientific calculator is often included.

== Linear encoders ==
All encoders have a scale that attaches to the moving part (the table, carriage, knee or quill) and a reader that attaches to the part that does not move. All are subject to damage from impact, so should be protected with a metallic shield.

=== Glass scales ===
Made from strips of high-quality glass with evenly etched marks just like the marks of a ruler, but very small (typically 5 μm apart, but in some instances can be smaller, such as 1 μm for a lathes cross slide). Two optical sensors (phototransistors or photodiodes) are placed very close to each other to make a linear incremental encoder. When the machine axis moves, the dark marks move under the optical encoders triggering them in succession. If movement is from, for example, left to right, encoder A is triggered first and encoder B afterwards. So the computer can know that the scale moved 5μm to the right. And, if encoder B triggers first and A does as follow the computer knows it was in the other direction.

Commercial models are enclosed in an aluminum "box" with a rubber protection on the side where the encoder slides. Used primarily where shielding from coolant and chips is necessary or where a resolution of 5μm (0.0002 in) or better is required (surface grinders).

=== Electronic scales ===
Instead of glass, a printed circuit on a stainless steel ruler is used to trigger at least two microelectronic Hall-effect sensors. Resolution is limited to 10 μm (0.0005 in) but shielding from coolant and flying chip is not a requirement. These scales are very resistant to everyday shop contaminants and debris. Electronic scales are much cheaper than their glass counterparts.

Electronic scales are available with built-in displays so they can be used independently.

=== Ball scales ===
The ball scales produced by Newall use an electromagnetic field to track ball bearings in a tube. They sell under the trade names Spherosyn and Microsyn. They work only with Newall DROs.

=== Magnetic scales ===
Magnetic scales use an embedded magnetic strip to track position. Benefits include being coolant and dust proof. Unique to magnetic scales is the ability for the user to cut or shorten them to a desired length.

=== Rack and gear scales ===
These models use a rack (toothed metal strip) that meshes with a gear that turns a rotary encoder. Claimed accuracy of 0.002 inches per foot, though users frequently report it Is much more accurate, with no measurable deviation over several feet of travel. Debris getting between the gear and rack is a concern.

== Quill DRO ==
=== Vertical quill DRO ===
Vertical quill DRO

The vertical quill DRO is a speciality DRO system composed of a computer and an electronic scale in one small piece of equipment, usually battery-powered. It is installed on the quill of a milling machine (hence its name). At this part of the machine coolant splash, flying chips and accidental shock are day-to-day events, therefore it is a very bad place for a glass scale used in conventional DROs. It also gives the operator a lot of comfort by being placed right in front of his eyes next to the controls that adjust the machine and it doesn't have any wires that could get trapped in the cluttered quill area.

A very common setup is to have a regular DRO with glass scales on the milling machine's table and a separate vertical quill DRO. This gives a resolution of 0.005mm to the table position and 0.01mm to the quill. Both exceed by far the expected "0.04mm accuracy of the milling process".

=== Horizontal quill DRO ===
The horizontal quill DRO is very much like the vertical version, except that it is designed to be installed in a horizontal position. The only difference is the orientation of the display and the buttons are altered to be seen and operated horizontally. This device is not for standard shop equipment and is used in research and calibration of other measuring equipment.
