= Löwenherz thread =

The Löwenherz thread is a largely obsolete metric thread form designed in the late nineteenth century and frequently applied in precision instruments. It is named after Dr. Leopold Löwenherz, who was the director of the metrology institute Physikalisch-Technische Bundesanstalt in Berlin.

== History ==
In 1888, the Verein Deutscher Ingenieure introduced a thread form that specified threads for diameters from sizes 6 millimeters in diameter to 40 millimeters in diameter. In 1892, at the Congress for Introduction of Standardized Threads for Fixing Screws in Fine Mechanics in Munich, it was decided that the thread form would be truncated. The final form was announced in Berlin in 1894, where the series of thread forms was expanded to include sizes as small as 1 millimeter in diameter.

== Description ==
The Löwenherz thread form is unique in having a thread pitch angle of 53° 8′ (53.1333°), which is a smaller angle than the ISO metric thread form but a larger angle than the Thury thread form. The unusual angle was chosen so that the pitch would be approximately equal to the thread's triangular height; however, the design was later truncated (flattened) at the roots and crests of the thread by a factor of one-eight the pitch, so the pitch is about 25% larger than the height, and the thread's depth is about 75% the length of its pitch. The Löwenherz fastener is specified for 31 diameters at irregular intervals ranging 1–40 mm, each with a single corresponding pitch. (This further differentiates the Löwenherz thread from the ISO metric thread, where screws must be specified by both their diameter and pitch because multiple pitches exist for a single diameter.) Löwenherz fasteners are assembled using standard metric wrenches or sockets, and often the hex size for bolt heads and nuts is repeated (so 17 mm wrenches can be used on both 9 mm and 10 mm Löwenherz hardware).

== Applications and competing thread forms ==
The Löwenherz thread was used extensively in measuring instruments (like micrometers, which achieve greater precision with finer thread pitches) and in shell manufacturing. It was also popular choice for use in optical instruments, especially in Germany. In addition to seeing its use in instruments designed in Germany, Austria and France, the Löwenhetz thread was once adopted by the Bureau of Standards in the United States as a solution to the lack of uniformity in the type of screws used in American-made instruments.

As a precision or scientific thread, the Löwenherz form was rivaled by two contemporary forms: Swiss-designed Thury thread and its derivative the British Association thread. In modern applications, the Löwenherz thread has been replaced with the DIN 13 standard for metric screws. ISO fasteners are available in many of the same pitches and diameters as Löwenherz fasteners; however, ISO and Löwenherz fasteners are not directly interchangeable because the difference in the thread geometry prevents proper mating of fastening components (so an M6x1.0 screw could not be safely installed in a hole tapped for a 6 mm Löwenherz screw, even though they share the same pitch and nominal diameter).
