= British Standard Whitworth =

Screw thread standard

British Standard Whitworth (BSW) is a screw thread standard that uses imperial (inch-based) units. It was devised and specified by British engineer Joseph Whitworth in 1841, making it the world's first national screw thread standard. It became widely adopted across the United Kingdom and its former colonies, influencing engineering practices globally. BSW also laid the foundation for several related thread standards, including British Standard Fine (BSF), British Standard Pipe (BSP), British Standard Conduit (BSCon) and British Standard Copper (BSCopper) threads. Although largely superseded by metric standards in modern engineering, BSW remains in use in restoration, vintage machinery, and certain legacy industries.

== History ==
The Whitworth thread was the world's first national screw thread standard, devised and specified by Joseph Whitworth in 1841. Until then, the only standardization was what little had been done by individual people and companies, with some companies' in-house standards spreading to a limited extent within their industries. Whitworth's new standard specified a 55° thread angle and a thread depth of 0.640327p and a radius of 0.137329p, where p is the pitch. The thread pitch increases with diameter in steps specified on a chart.

The Whitworth thread system was later to be adopted as a British Standard to become British Standard Whitworth (BSW). An example of the use of the Whitworth thread are the Royal Navy's Crimean War gunboats. These are the first instance of mass-production techniques being applied to marine engineering, as the following quotation from the obituary from The Times of 24 January 1887 for Sir Joseph Whitworth (1803–1887) shows:

The Crimean War began, and Sir Charles Napier demanded of the Admiralty 120 gunboats, each with engines of 60 horsepower, for the campaign of 1855 in the Baltic. There were just ninety days in which to meet this requisition, and, short as the time was, the building of the gunboats presented no difficulty. It was otherwise however with the engines, and the Admiralty were in despair. Suddenly, by a flash of the mechanical genius which was inherent in him, the late Mr John Penn solved the difficulty, and solved it quite easily. He had a pair of engines on hand of the exact size. He took them to pieces and he distributed the parts among the best machine shops in the country, telling each to make ninety sets exactly in all respects to the sample. The orders were executed with unfailing regularity, and he actually completed ninety sets of engines of 60 horsepower in ninety days – a feat which made the great Continental Powers stare with wonder, and which was possible only because the Whitworth standards of measurement and of accuracy and finish were by that time thoroughly recognised and established throughout the country.

An original example of the gunboat type engine was raised from the wreck of the SS Xantho by the Western Australian Museum. On disassembly, all its threads were shown to be of the Whitworth type.

With the adoption of BSW by British railway companies, many of which had previously used their own standards both for threads and for bolt head and nut profiles, and the growing need generally for standardisation in manufacturing specifications, it came to dominate British manufacturing.

In the US, BSW was replaced when steel bolts replaced iron, but was still being used for some aluminium parts as late as the 1960s and 1970s when metric-based standards International Inch replaced the U.S. inch and U.K. inch in 1951–1964.

American Unified Coarse (UNC) was originally based on almost the same Imperial fractions. The Unified thread angle is 60° and has flattened crests (Whitworth crests are rounded). From 1/4 in up to 1 1/2 in, thread pitch is the same in both systems except that the thread pitch for the 1/2 in bolt is 12 threads per inch (tpi) in BSW versus 13 tpi in the UNC.

== Thread form ==
Whitworth thread form

The form of a Whitworth thread is based on a fundamental triangle with an angle of 55° at each peak and valley. The sides are at a flank angle of Θ = 27.5° perpendicular to the axis. Thus, if the thread pitch is p, the height of the fundamental triangle is H = p/(2tanΘ) = 0.96049106p. However, the top and bottom 1/6 of each of these triangles is cut off, so the actual depth of thread (the difference between major and minor diameters) is 2/3 of that value, or h = p/(3tanΘ) = 0.64032738p. The peaks are further reduced by rounding them with a 2×(90° − Θ) = 180° − 55° = 125° circular arc. This arc has a height of e = Hsin Θ/6 = 0.073917569p (leaving a straight flank depth of h − 2e = 0.49249224p) and a radius of r = e/(1 − sin Θ) = 0.13732908p.

== List of thread sizes ==
Below is the historical thread size table, not to be confused with G threads, which are actually in use as British Standard Pipe. For example, a G½ (half inch) is 20.955 mm in diameter.

Whitworth thread sizes
Major diameter		Thread density	Thread pitch	Minor diameter		75% tap drill size	
(in)	(mm)	(in^{−1})	(mm)	(in)	(mm)	(in)	(mm)
1/16	1.588	60	0.423	0.0412	1.046	#56	1.2
3/32	2.381	48	0.529	0.0671	1.704	#49	1.9
1/8	3.175	40	0.635	0.0930	2.362	#39	2.6
5/32	3.969	32	0.794	0.1162	2.951	#30	3.2
3/16	4.763	24	1.058	0.1341	3.406	#26	3.7
7/32	5.556	24	1.058	0.1654	4.201	#16	4.5
1/4	6.350	20	1.270	0.1860	4.724	#9	5.1
5/16	7.938	18	1.411	0.2414	6.132	F	6.6
3/8	9.525	16	1.588	0.2950	7.493	5/16	8.0
7/16	11.113	14	1.814	0.3460	8.788	U	9.4
1/2	12.700	12	2.117	0.3933	9.990	27/64	10.7
9/16	14.288	12	2.117	0.4558	11.577	31/64	12.3
5/8	15.875	11	2.309	0.5086	12.918	17/32	13.7
11/16	17.463	11	2.309	0.5711	14.506	19/32	15.2
3/4	19.050	10	2.540	0.6219	15.796	21/32	16.6
13/16	20.638	10	2.540	0.6844	17.384	23/32	18.2
7/8	22.225	9	2.822	0.7327	18.611	49/64	19.5
15/16	23.813	9	2.822	0.7952	20.198	53/64	21.1
1	25.400	8	3.175	0.8399	21.333	7/8	22.3
1 1/8	28.575	7	3.629	0.9420	23.927	63/64	25.1
1 1/4	31.750	7	3.629	1.0670	27.102	1 7/64	28.3
1 3/8	34.925	6	4.233	1.1616	29.505	1 7/32	30.9
1 1/2	38.100	6	4.233	1.2866	32.680	1 5/16	34.0
1 5/8	41.275	5	5.080	1.3689	34.770	1 7/16	36.4
1 3/4	44.450	5	5.080	1.4939	37.945	1 9/16	39.6
1 7/8	47.625	4 1/2	5.644	1.5904	40.396	1 5/8	42.2
2	50.800	4 1/2	5.644	1.7154	43.571	1 3/4	45.4
2 1/8	53.975	4 1/2	5.644	1.8404	46.746	1 7/8	48.6
2 1/4	57.150	4	6.350	1.9298	49.017	2	51.1
2 3/8	60.325	4	6.350	2.0548	52.192	2 1/8	54.2
2 1/2	63.500	4	6.350	2.1798	55.367	2 1/4	57.4
2 5/8	66.675	4	6.350	2.3048	58.542	2 3/8	60.6
2 3/4	69.850	3 1/2	7.257	2.3841	60.556	2 1/2	62.9
2 7/8	73.025	3 1/2	7.257	2.5091	63.731	2 5/8	66.1
3	76.200	3 1/2	7.257	2.6341	66.906	2 3/4	69.2
3 1/4	82.550	3 1/4	7.815	2.8560	72.542	3	75.0
3 1/2	88.900	3 1/4	7.815	3.1060	78.892	3 1/4	81.4
3 3/4	95.250	3	8.467	3.3231	84.407	3 3/8	87.1
4	101.600	3	8.467	3.5731	90.757	3 5/8	93.5
4 1/4	107.950	2 7/8	8.835	3.8046	96.637	3 7/8	99.5
4 1/2	114.300	2 7/8	8.835	4.0546	102.987	4 1/8	105.8
4 3/4	120.650	2 3/4	9.236	4.2843	108.821	4 3/8	111.8
5	127.000	2 3/4	9.236	4.5343	115.171	4 5/8	118.1
5 1/4	133.350	2 5/8	9.676	4.7621	120.957	4 7/8	124.1
5 1/2	139.700	2 5/8	9.676	5.0121	127.307	5 1/8	130.4
5 3/4	146.050	2 1/2	10.160	5.2377	133.038	5 3/8	136.3
6	152.400	2 1/2	10.160	5.4877	139.388	5 5/8	142.6

== Spanner (wrench) size ==
To simplify matters, the term hexagon is used in this section to denote either bolt head or nut.

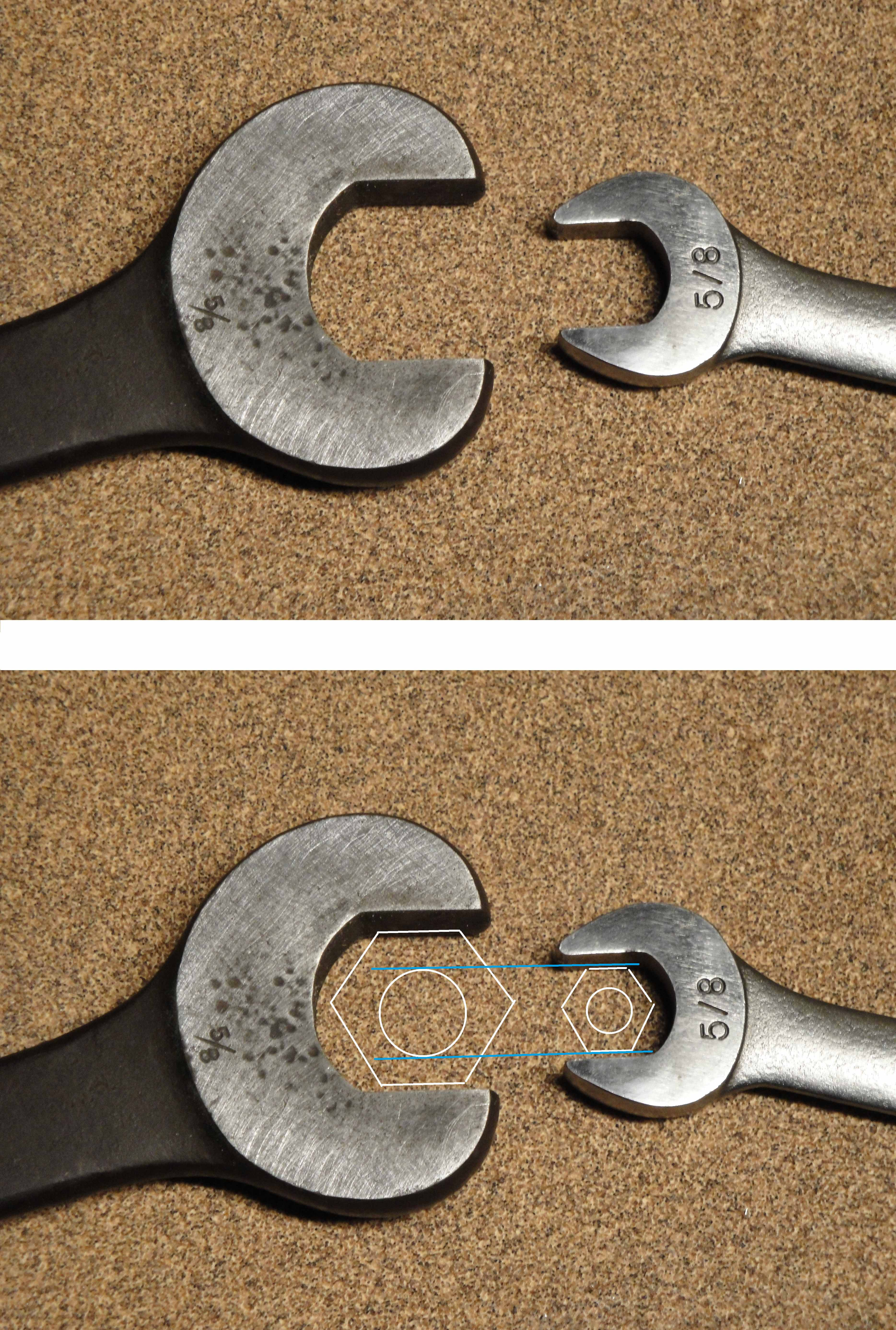
Two spanners, both nominal size 5/8 in, with a diagram superimposed to show the logic that allows them both to be nominal size 5/8 in when their actual sizes are clearly different (across-flats distance vs screw diameter). The across-flats definition is the common standard today, and has been for many decades. The larger spanner in this photo is from the 1920s or earlier. Its face was polished to allow the size stamp to show well in the photograph. This example is American, but it illustrates the way that spanners for Whitworth fasteners were typically labelled.

Whitworth and BSF spanner markings refer to the bolt diameter, rather than the distance across the flats of the hexagon (A/F) as in other standards. Confusion can arise because each Whitworth hexagon was originally one size larger than that of the corresponding BSF fastener. This leads to instances where for example, a spanner marked 7/16 BSF is the same size as one marked 3/8 W. In both cases the spanner jaw width of 0.710 in, the width across the hexagon flat, is the same.

Certain branches of industry used Whitworth fasteners with a smaller hexagon (identical to BSF of the same bolt diameter) under the designation "AutoWhit" or Auto-Whit and this series was formalised by the British Engineering Standards Association in 1929 as standard No. 193, with the 'original' series being No. 190 and the BSF series No. 191.

During World War II the smaller size hexagon was adopted more widely to save metal and this usage persisted thereafter. Thus it is today common to encounter a Whitworth hexagon which does not fit the nominally correct spanner and following the previous example, a more modern spanner may be marked 7/16 BS to indicate that they have a jaw size of 0.710 in and designed to take either the (later) 7/16 BSW or 7/16 BSF hexagon.

Whitworth fasteners with the larger hexagons to BS 190 are now often colloquially referred to as 'pre-war' size, even though that is not strictly correct.

=== List of hex head sizes ===
Hex head sizes
Size	BS 190		BS 1083		DIN
(in)	(in)	(mm)	(in)	(mm)	(mm)
1/8	0.338	8.6	—	—	—
3/16	0.445	11.3	—	—	—
1/4	0.525	13.3	0.445	11.3	11
5/16	0.600	15.2	0.525	13.3	14
3/8	0.710	18.0	0.600	15.2	17
7/16	0.820	20.8	0.710	18.0	19
1/2	0.920	23.4	0.820	20.8	22
9/16	1.010	25.7	0.920	23.4	—
5/8	1.100	27.9	1.010	25.7	27
3/4	1.300	33.0	1.200	30.5	32
7/8	1.480	37.6	1.300	33.0	36
1	1.670	42.4	1.480	37.6	41
1 1/8	1.860	47.2	1.670	42.4	—
1 1/4	2.050	52.1	1.860	47.2	—
1 1/2	2.410	61.2	2.220	56.4	—
1 3/4	2.760	70.1	2.580	65.5	—
2	3.150	80.0	2.760	70.1	—

== Comparison with other standards ==
The British Standard Fine (BSF) standard has the same thread angle as the BSW, but has a finer thread pitch and smaller thread depth. This is more like the modern "mechanical" screw and was used for fine machinery and for steel bolts.

The British Standard Cycle (BSC) standard which replaced the Cycle Engineers' Institute (CEI) standard was used on British bicycles and motorcycles. It uses a thread angle of 60° compared to the Whitworth 55° and very fine thread pitches.

The British Association screw thread (BA) standard is sometimes classed with the Whitworth standard fasteners because it is often found in the same machinery as the Whitworth standard. However it is actually a metric based standard that uses a 47.5° thread angle and has its own set of head sizes. BA threads have diameters of 6 mm (0BA) and smaller, and were and still are particularly used in precision machinery.

The Whitworth 55° angle remains commonly used today worldwide in form of the 15 British standard pipe threads defined in ISO 7, which are commonly used in water supply, cooling, pneumatics, and hydraulic systems. These threads are designated by a number between 1/16 and 6 that originates from the nominal internal diameter (i/d) in inches of a steel pipe for which these threads were designed. These pipe thread designations do not refer to any thread diameter.

Other threads that used the Whitworth 55° angle include Brass Threads, British Standard Conduit (BSCon), Model Engineers' (ME), and British Standard Copper (BSCopper).

== Current usage ==
The widely used (except in the US) British Standard Pipe thread, as defined by the ISO 228 standard (formerly BS-2779), uses Whitworth standard thread form. Even in the United States, personal computer liquid cooling components use the G1/4 thread from this series.

The Leica Thread-Mount used on rangefinder cameras and on many enlarging lenses is 39 mm by 26 turns-per-inch Whitworth, an artifact of this having been developed by a German company specializing in microscopes and thus equipped with tooling capable of handling threads in inches and in Whitworth.

The 5/32 in Whitworth threads have been the standard Meccano thread for many years and it is still the thread in use by the French Meccano Company.

Fixings for garden gates traditionally used Whitworth carriage bolts, and these are still the standard supplied in UK and Australia.

== Historical misuse ==
British Morris and MG engines from 1923 to 1955 were built using metric threads with bolt heads and nuts dimensioned for Whitworth spanners and sockets. In 1919, Morris Motors took over the French Hotchkiss engine works which had moved to Coventry during the First World War. The Hotchkiss machine tools were of metric thread but metric spanners were not readily available in Britain at the time, so fasteners were made with metric thread but Whitworth heads.

== In popular culture ==
In the 2011 movie Cars 2 by Disney / Pixar, the vital clue to the discovery of the villain, Sir Miles Axlerod, is that he uses Whitworth bolts. Although Axlerod does not precisely resemble any real car (whereas numerous other characters are closely modelled on real cars), he seems most closely to match the original Range Rover Classic. In reality, early model Range Rovers used parts with imperial dimensions, although the photograph of the villain's engine is virtually identical to the later 3.5-litre, single plenum Rover V8 (A design purchased from GM's Buick).

== See also ==
Other thread standards:

- British Association screw threads (BA)
- British standard brass thread
- British Standard Cycle
- British standard fine thread (BSF)
- British Standard Pipe (BSP)
- ISO metric screw thread
- Unified Thread Standard (UTS, including UNC, UNF, UNS and UNEF)

== Bibliography ==
- Oberg, E., Jones, F.D., Hussain, M., McCauley, C.J., Ryffel, H.H. and Heald, R.M. (2008) Machinery's handbook : a reference book for the mechanical engineer, designer, manufacturing engineer, draftsman, toolmaker, and machinist, 28th Ed., New York : Industrial Press, ISBN 978-0-8311-2800-5, p. 1858–1860
