= British Standard Fine =

Imperial-unit-based screw-thread standard

British Standard Fine (BSF) is a screw thread form, as a fine-pitch alternative to British Standard Whitworth (BSW) thread. It was used for steel bolts and nuts on and in much of Britain's machinery, including cars, prior to adoption of Unified, and later Metric, standards. For highly stressed conditions, especially in motorcycles, a finer thread, British Standard Cycle (BSC), was used as well.

BSF was developed by R. E. B. Crompton, and his assistant George Field. BSF threads use the 55 degree Whitworth thread form. It was introduced by the British Engineering Standards Association in 1908.

The table provides BSF sizes, the threads per inch and spanner jaw sizes. The BSC column indicates where BSF and BSC threads match. The table shows suitable tapping drill sizes. Uncommon sizes are shown in italics.

== Table ==
Diameter			Thread density	As BSC?	Nut, approximate		Tap drill
(in)		(mm)	(in^{−1})	As BSC?	(mm)	(in)	Tap drill
3/16	0.19	4.83	32	Yes	8.59	11/32 6pt	5/32 in
7/32	0.22	5.59	28	No			4.6 mm
1/4	0.25	6.35	26	Yes	11.30		5.3 mm
5/16	0.31	7.87	22	No	13.35	17/32	17/64 in
3/8	0.375	9.53	20	No	15.24	5/8	8.2 mm
7/16	0.44	11.18	18	No	18.03	11/16	9.7 mm
1/2	0.50	12.70	16	No	20.83	13/16	7/16 in
9/16	0.56	14.22	16	No	23.37	15/16	1/2 in
5/8	0.63	16.00	14	No	25.65	1 6pt	14 mm
11/16	0.69	17.53	14	No	27.94	1 1/8 6pt	15.5 mm
3/4	0.75	19.05	12	No	30.48	1 1/4 6pt	16.75 mm
7/8	0.88	22.35	11	No	33.02	1 5/16	25/32 in
1	1.00	25.40	10	No	37.59	1 1/2	22.75 mm
1 1/8	18	457.20	9	No	42.42	1 11/16	26.50 mm
1 1/4	1.25	31.75	9	No	47.24	1 7/8	28.75 mm
1 1/2	1.50	38.10	8	No	56.39	2 1/4	34.50 mm

== Bibliography ==
- P.A. Sidders, ed. (1969). Guide to World Screw Threads. New York: Industrial Press. ISBN 0-8311-1092-9.
