= ISO screw thread =

ISO screw thread may refer to:

- ISO metric screw thread
- ISO inch screw thread
