= UNEF =

UNEF may refer to:

- Unified National Extra Fine screw thread, a Unified Thread Standard
- Unidade Nacional de Estrangeiros e Fronteiras (transl. National Force of Foreigners and Borders), a Portuguese police unit part of the Polícia de Segurança Pública
- Union Nationale des Étudiants de France (transl. National Union of Students of France), a French students' union
- United Nations Emergency Force, a UN force deployed in the Middle East in 1956
- United Nations Exploratory Force, a fictional military organization in the science fiction novel The Forever War
