= Unified Thread Standard =

Standard thread form

The Unified Thread Standard (UTS) defines a standard thread form and series—along with allowances, tolerances, and designations—for screw threads commonly used in the United States and Canada. It is the main standard for bolts, nuts, and a wide variety of other threaded fasteners used in these countries. It has the same 60° profile as the ISO metric screw thread, but the characteristic dimensions of each UTS thread (outer diameter and pitch) were chosen as an inch fraction rather than a millimeter value. The UTS is currently controlled by ASME/ANSI in the United States. Note: This thread series is often mistakenly called "Unified National" instead of "Unified". This error is possibly due to confusion with the obsolete "American National" series.

== Basic profile ==
The basic profile of all UTS threads is the same as that of all ISO metric screw threads. Only the commonly used values for D_{maj} and P differ between the two standards.

Each thread in the series is characterized by its major diameter D_{maj} and its pitch, P. UTS threads consist of a symmetric V-shaped thread. In any plane containing the thread axis, the flanks of the V have an angle of 60° to each other. The outermost 1/8 and the innermost 1/4 of the height H of the V-shape are cut off from the profile.

The major diameter D_{maj} is the diameter of the screw measured from the outer edge of the threads. The minor diameter D_{min} (also known as the root diameter) is the diameter of the screw measured from the inner edge of the threads. The major diameter may be slightly different from the shank diameter, which is the diameter of the unthreaded part of the screw. The diameters are sometimes given approximately in fractions of an inch (e.g. the major diameter of a #6 screw is 0.1380 in, approximately 9/64 in = 0.140625 in.

The pitch P is the distance between thread peaks. For UTS threads, which are single-start threads, it is equal to the lead, the axial distance that the screw advances during a 360° rotation. UTS threads do not usually use the pitch parameter; instead a parameter known as threads per inch (TPI) is used, which is the reciprocal of the pitch.

The relationship between the height H and the pitch P is found using the following equation where θ is half the included angle of the thread, in this case 30°:

$$\begin{align}H &= \frac{ {P}}{2\tan \theta} = \frac{ \sqrt 3 }{2} \cdot P \\[.5 em]
&\approx 0.866025 \cdot P\,.\end{align}$$

In an external (male) thread (e.g., on a bolt), the major diameter D_{maj} and the minor diameter D_{min} define maximum dimensions of the thread. This means that the external thread must end flat at D_{maj}, but can be rounded out below the minor diameter D_{min}. Conversely, in an internal (female) thread (e.g., in a nut), the major and minor diameters are minimum dimensions, therefore the thread profile must end flat at D_{min} but may be rounded out beyond D_{maj}. These provisions are to prevent any interferences.

The minor diameter D_{min} and effective pitch diameter D_{p} are derived from the major diameter and pitch as:

$$\begin{align}
D_\mathrm{min} &= D_\mathrm{maj} - 2H\cdot\frac58 = D_\mathrm{maj} - \frac{ 5 {\sqrt 3}}{8}\cdot P \approx D_\mathrm{maj} - 1.082532 \cdot P \\
D_\mathrm{p} &= D_\mathrm{maj} - 2H\cdot\frac38 = D_\mathrm{maj} - \frac{ 3 {\sqrt 3}}{8}\cdot P \approx D_\mathrm{maj} - 0.649519 \cdot P.
\end{align}$$

== Designation ==
The standard designation for a UTS thread is a number indicating the nominal (major) diameter of the thread, followed by the pitch measured in threads per inch. For diameters smaller than 1/4 inch, the diameter is indicated by an integer number defined in the standard; for all other diameters, the inch figure is given.

This number pair is optionally followed by the letters UNC, UNF or UNEF (Unified) if the diameter-pitch combination is from the coarse, fine, or extra fine series, and may also be followed by a tolerance class.

Example: #6-32 UNC 2B (major diameter: 0.1380 inch, pitch: 32 tpi)

Unified Screw Threads — UNC, UNF and UNEF
Major diameter D_{maj} (inch, mm)			Thread density (d, threads per inch) and thread pitch (p)									Preferred cutting tap drill size					
Major diameter D_{maj} (inch, mm)			Coarse (UNC)			Fine (UNF)			Extra fine (UNEF)			Preferred cutting tap drill size					
Major diameter D_{maj} (inch, mm)			d (TPI)	p (inch, mm)		d (TPI)	p (inch, mm)		d (TPI)	p (inch, mm)		Coarse		Fine		Extra fine	
#0	0.0600	1.5240	None			80	0.012500	0.3175	None					3/64″	.047		
#1	0.0730	1.8542	64	0.015625	0.3969	72	0.013888	0.3528	None			#53	.060	#53	.060		
#2	0.0860	2.1844	56	0.017857	0.4536	64	0.015625	0.3969	None			#50	.070	#50	.070		
#3	0.0990	2.5146	48	0.020833	0.5292	56	0.017857	0.4536	None			#47	.079	#45	.082		
#4	0.1120	2.8448	40	0.025000	0.6350	48	0.020833	0.5292	None			#43	.089	#42	.094		
#5	0.1250	3.1750	40	0.025000	0.6350	44	0.022727	0.5773	None			#38	.102	#37	.104		
#6	0.1380	3.5052	32	0.031250	0.7938	40	0.025000	0.6350	None			#36	.107	#33	.113		
#8	0.1640	4.1656	32	0.031250	0.7938	36	0.027778	0.7056	None			#29	.136	#29	.136		
#10	0.1900	4.8260	24	0.041667	1.0583	32	0.031250	0.7938	None			#25	.150	#21	.159		
#12	0.2160	5.4864	24	0.041667	1.0583	28	0.035714	0.9071	32	0.031250	0.7938	#16	.177	#14	.182	3/16″	.188
1/4″	0.2500	6.3500	20	0.050000	1.2700	28	0.035714	0.9071	32	0.031250	0.7938	#7	.201	#3	.213	7/32″	.219
5/16″	0.3125	7.9375	18	0.055556	1.4111	24	0.041667	1.0583	32	0.031250	0.7938	F	.257	I	.272	9/32″	.281
3/8″	0.3750	9.5250	16	0.062500	1.5875	24	0.041667	1.0583	32	0.031250	0.7938	5/16″	.313	Q	.332	11/32″	.344
7/16″	0.4375	11.1125	14	0.071428	1.8143	20	0.050000	1.2700	28	0.035714	0.9071	U	.368	25/64″	.391	Y	.404
1/2″	0.5000	12.7000	13	0.076923	1.9538	20	0.050000	1.2700	28	0.035714	0.9071	27/64″	.422	29/64″	.453	15/32″	.469
9/16″	0.5625	14.2875	12	0.083333	2.1167	18	0.055556	1.4111	24	0.041667	1.0583	31/64″	.484	1/2″	.500	33/64″	.516
5/8″	0.6250	15.8750	11	0.090909	2.3091	18	0.055556	1.4111	24	0.041667	1.0583	17/32″	.531	9/16″	.563	37/64″	.578
3/4″	0.7500	19.0500	10	0.100000	2.5400	16	0.062500	1.5875	20	0.050000	1.2700	21/32″	.656	11/16″	.688	45/64″	.703
7/8″	0.8750	22.2250	9	0.111111	2.8222	14	0.071428	1.8143	20	0.050000	1.2700	49/64″	.766	51/64″	.797	53/64″	.828
1″	1.0000	25.4000	8	0.125000	3.1750	12 (Note: For many years non-standard 1-inch 14-tpi nuts and bolts have been widely used instead of standard-sized 1-inch 12-tpi fasteners; consequently 1″-14 fasteners are easier to find and less expensive than 1″-12 fasteners. After several decades 1″-14 fasteners have now come to be commonly referred to as "Standard Fine Thread" or "UNF". Though technically incorrect (the UNF standard specifies 1″-12), size 1″-14 is universally accepted as standard for fine-threaded 1-inch fasteners, and "1-inch 14-tpi NF" has become established as a "common use" term, or "a genericized brand name/standard". In other words, the 1″-12 standard has lacked effective enforcement for a long enough time (many decades) to give generic trademark–like status to 1-inch 14-tpi fasteners.)	0.083333	2.1167	20	0.050000	1.2700	7/8″	.875	59/64″	.922	61/64″	.953
1 1/8″	1.1250	28.5750	7	0.142857	3.6286	12	0.083333	2.1167									
1 1/4″	1.2500	31.7500	7	0.142857	3.6286	12	0.083333	2.1167									
1 3/8″	1.3750	34.9250	6	0.166667	4.2333	12	0.083333	2.1167									
1 1/2″	1.5000	38.1000	6	0.166667	4.2333	12	0.083333	2.1167									
1 3/4″	1.7500	44.4500	5	0.200000	5.0800												
2″	2.0000	50.8000	4 1/2	0.222222	5.6444												
2 1/4″	2.2500	57.1500	4 1/2	0.222222	5.6444												
2 1/2″	2.5000	63.5000	4	0.250000	6.3500												
2 3/4″	2.7500	69.8500	4	0.250000	6.3500												
3″	3.0000	76.2000	4	0.250000	6.3500												
3 1/4″	3.2500	82.5500	4	0.250000	6.3500												
3 1/2″	3.5000	88.9000	4	0.250000	6.3500												
3 3/4″	3.7500	95.2500	4	0.250000	6.3500												
4″	4.0000	101.6000	4	0.250000	6.3500												

The following formula is used to calculate the major diameter of a numbered screw greater than or equal to 0: Major diameter = Screw # × 0.013 in + 0.060 in. For example, the major diameter of a #10 screw is 10 × 0.013 in + 0.060 in = 0.190 in. To calculate the major diameter of "aught" size screws count the number of extra zeroes and multiply this number by 0.013 in and subtract from 0.060 in. For example, the major diameter of a #0000 screw is 0.060 in − (3 × 0.013 in) = 0.060 in − 0.039 in = 0.021 in.

The number series of machine screws has been extended downward to include #00-90 (0.047 in = 0.060 in − 0.013 in) and #000-120 (0.034 in = 0.060 in − 2 × 0.013 in) screws; however, the main standard for screws smaller than #0 is ANSI/ASME standard B1.10 Unified Miniature Screw Threads. This defines a series of metric screws named after their major diameters in millimetres, from 0.30 UNM to 1.40 UNM. Preferred sizes are 0.3, 0.4, 0.5, 0.6, 0.8, 1.0 and 1.2 mm, with additional defined sizes halfway between. The standard thread pitch is approximately 1/4 of the major diameter. The thread form is slightly modified to increase the minor diameter, and thus the strength of screws and taps. The major diameter still extends to within 1/8H of the theoretical sharp V, but the total depth of the thread is reduced 4% from 5/8H = 5/8 cos(30°) P ≈ 0.541P to 0.52P. This increases the amount of the theoretical sharp V which is cut off at the minor diameter by 10% from 0.25H to 7/8 − 0.52/(cos 30°) ≈ 0.27456H.

The number series of machine screws once included more odd numbers and went up to #16 or more. Standardization efforts in the late 19th and the early part of the 20th century reduced the range of sizes considerably. Now, it is less common to see machine screws larger than #14, or odd number sizes other than #1, #3 and #5. Even though #14 and #16 screws are still available, they are not as common as sizes #0 through #12.

Sometimes "special" diameter and pitch combinations (UNS) are used, for example a 0.619 in (15.7 mm) major diameter with 20 threads per inch. UNS threads are rarely used for bolts, but rather on nuts, tapped holes, and threaded ODs. Because of this UNS taps are readily available. Most UNS threads have more threads per inch than the correlating UNF or UNEF standard; therefore they are often the strongest thread available. Because of this they are often used in applications where high stresses are encountered, such as machine tool spindles or automotive spindles.

== Gauging ==
A screw thread gauging system comprises a list of screw thread characteristics that must be inspected to establish the dimensional acceptability of the screw threads on a threaded product and the gauge(s) which shall be used when inspecting those characteristics.

Currently this gauging for UTS is controlled by:

ASME/ANSI B1.2-1983 Gauges And Gauging For Unified Inch Screw Threads
This Standard provides essential specifications and dimensions for the gauges used on Unified inch screw threads UN [unified] and UNR [external threads only] thread form, and covers the specifications and dimensions for the thread gauges and measuring equipment listed in Tables 1 and 2. The basic purpose and use of each gauge are also described.
ASME/ANSI B1.3-2007 Screw Thread Gauging Systems for Acceptability: Inch and Metric Screw Threads (UN, UNR, UNJ, M, and MJ)
1. This Standard presents screw thread gauging systems suitable for determining the acceptability of Unified [UN], UNR [external threads only], UNJ [internal and external threads], M, and MJ screw threads on externally and internally threaded products. It establishes the criteria for screw thread acceptance when a gauging system is used.
2. A screw thread gauging system comprises a list of screw thread characteristics that must be inspected to establish the dimensional acceptability of the screw threads on a threaded product and the gauge(s) which shall be used when inspecting those characteristics.
3. Federal Government Use. When this Standard is approved by the Department of Defense and federal agencies and is incorporated into Federal Standard-H28/20 [FED-STD-H28/20], Screw Thread Standards for Federal Services, Section 20, the use of this Standard by the federal government is subject to all the requirements and limitations of Federal Standard-H28/20 [FED-STD-H28/20].

These standards provide essential specifications and dimensions for the gauges used on Unified inch screw threads (UN, UNR, UNJ thread form) on externally and internally threaded products. It also covers the specifications and dimensions for the thread gauges and measuring equipment. The basic purpose and use of each gauge are also described. It also establishes the criteria for screw thread acceptance when a gauging system is used.

== Tolerance classes ==
A classification system exists for ease of manufacture and interchangeability of fabricated threaded items. Most (but certainly not all) threaded items are made to a classification standard called the Unified Screw Thread Standard Series. This system is analogous to the fits used with assembled parts.

- Class 1 threads are loose fit, intended for ease of assembly or use in a dirty environment.
- Class 2 threads are free fit, and the most common. They are designed to maximize strength considering typical machine shop capability and machine practice.
- Class 3 threads are medium fit, still quite common and used for closer tolerances on high quality work.
- Class 4 threads previously designated a close fit for even tighter tolerances, but this classification is now obsolete.
- Class 5 fit is an interference thread, requiring the use of a wrench for turning. These can be seen in applications like spring shackles on an automobile.

The letter suffix "A" or "B" denotes whether the threads are external or internal, respectively. Classes 1A, 2A, 3A apply to external threads; Classes 1B, 2B, 3B apply to internal threads.

Thread class refers to the acceptable range of pitch diameter for any given thread. The pitch diameter is indicated as Dp in the figure shown above. There are several methods that are used to measure the pitch diameter. The most common method used in production is by way of a go/no-go gauge.

== Related standards ==
- ASME/ANSI B1.1 – 2024 Unified Inch Screw Threads (UN, UNR, & UNJ Thread Forms)
- ASME/ANSI B1.7 – 2006 (Reaffirmed 2021) Screw Threads: Nomenclature, Definitions, and Letter Symbols
- ASME/ANSI B1.10M – 2004 Unified Miniature Screw Threads
- ASME/ANSI B1.21M – 1997 (Reaffirmed 2023) Metric Screw Threads: MJ Profile
- ASME/ANSI B1.30 – 2024 Screw Threads: Standard Practice for Calculating and Rounding Dimensions
- ISO 68-1:2023 – General Purpose Screw Threads — Basic and Design Profiles — Part 1: Metric Screw Threads
- ISO 68-2:2023 – General Purpose Screw Threads — Basic and Design Profiles — Part 2: Inch Screw Threads
- FED-STD-H28/2B – Unified Inch Screw Threads — UN and UNR Thread Forms
- FED-STD-H28/4B – Controlled Radius Root Screw Threads, UNJ Symbol
- SAE AS8879D – Screw Threads — UNJ Profile, Inch, Controlled Root Radius with Increased Minor Diameter
- MIL-S-8879C – Screw Threads, Controlled Radius Root with Increased Minor Diameter, General Specifications for

== See also ==
- British standard pipe thread
- British Standard Whitworth
- ISO metric screw thread
- List of drill and tap sizes
- List of screw drives
- List of thread standards
- National pipe thread
- Nut (hardware)
- William Sellers
- United States Standard thread

== Notes ==
=== Bibliography ===
- [Machinery's Handbook 29] Oberg, Erik; Jones, Franklin D.; Horton, Holbrook L.; Ryffel, Henry H. (2012). McCauley, Christopher J. (ed.). Machinery's Handbook (29th ed.). New York: Industrial Press. ISBN 978-0-8311-2901-9.
- Schwaller, Anthony E. (2004). Total Automotive Technology (4th ed.). Cengage Learning. ISBN 978-1-4018-2476-1.
