= List of thread standards =

A screw thread, often shortened to thread, is a helical structure used to convert between rotational and linear movement or force. A screw thread is an inclined plane wrapped around a cylinder or cone in the form of a helix, with the former being called a straight thread and the latter called a tapered thread. More screw threads are produced each year than any other machine element.

Threads are generally produced according to one of the many standards of thread systems. Standards Development Organizations such as the American National Standards Institute, American Society of Mechanical Engineers, SAE International, International Organization for Standardization, Deutsches Institut für Normung (German Institute for Standardization), British Association and others produce these standards for manufacturers to follow when producing threaded components.

== Currently used thread standards ==
Standard	Name	Type	Example
ASME B1.1-2003 (R2018)	Unified Inch Screw Threads (UN and UNR Thread Form)	V Thread Form	1/4″-20 UNC #4-40 UNC
ASME B1.5-1997 (R2014)	Acme Screw Threads	Trapezoidal Thread Form	Tr 60×9
ANSI/ASME B1.9-1973 (R2017)	Buttress Inch Screw Threads	Breech-Lock Thread Form	
ASME B1.10M-2004 (R2014)	Unified Miniature Screw Threads	V Thread Form	0.60 UNM
ANSI/ASME B1.11-1958 (R2016)	Microscope Objective Thread	V Thread Form	
ASME B1.13M-2005 (R2015)	Metric Screw Threads: M Profile	V Thread Form	
ASME B1.15-1995 (R2003)	Unified Inch Screw Threads (UNJ Thread Form)	V Thread Form	
ASME B1.20.1-2013	Pipe Threads, General Purpose (Inch)	Pipe Thread Form	
ANSI B1.20.3-1976 (R2013)	Dryseal Pipe Threads (Inch)	Pipe Thread Form	
ASME B1.20.7-1991 (R2013)	Hose Coupling Screw Threads - Inch	Pipe Thread Form	
ASME B1.21M-1997 (R2013)	Metric Screw Threads - MJ Profile	V Thread Form	
BS 84	Tables of BS Whitworth, BS Fine and BS Pipe Threads	V Thread Form (55°)	1/4″-20 BSW
ISO 68-1:1998	ISO general purpose screw threads—Basic profile—Part 1: Metric screw threads	V Thread Form	
ISO 68-2:1998	ISO general-purpose screw threads—Basic profile—Part 2: Inch screw threads	V Thread Form	
ISO 261:1998	ISO general purpose metric screw threads—General plan	V Thread Form	M6x1
ISO 262:1998	ISO general purpose metric screw threads—Selected sizes for screws, bolts and nuts	V Thread Form	
ISO 724:1993	ISO general-purpose metric screw threads—Basic dimensions	V Thread Form	
ISO 725:2009	ISO inch screw threads—Basic dimensions	V Thread Form 51386	
DIN 40400	Edison Thread	Round V Thread Form	

== Obsolete thread standards ==
Standard	Name	Type	Obsolescence date
BS 93:1951	British Association (B.A.) screw threads with tolerances for sizes 0 B.A. to 16 B.A.		1966
BS 93:2008	British Association (B.A.) screw threads		1966

== See also ==
- ISO metric screw thread
- "History of standardization" section of the screw thread article
- National pipe thread
