= ISO 965 =

ISO standard

ISO 965 (ISO general purpose metric screw thread—tolerances) is an International Organization for Standardization (ISO) standard for metric screw thread tolerances. It specifies the basic profile for ISO general purpose metric screw threads (M) conforming to ISO 261.

The tolerance system refers to the basic profile in accordance with ISO 68-1. The field of application and purpose of ISO 965 can be defined as "ISO 965 specifies a tolerance system for screw threads from 1mm diameter upwards.

== Thread tolerances ==
Limits for standard metric coarse threads according to ISO 965.

Thread size	Engagement length		Major diameter(d)		Pitch diameter(d2)	
in mm	from	to	max.	min.	max.	min.
M1	0.6	1.7	1.000	0.933	0.838	0.785
M1.1	0.6	1.7	1.100	1.033	0.938	0.885
M1.2	0.6	1.7	1.200	1.133	1.038	0.985
M1.4	0.7	2	1.400	1.325	1.205	1.149
M1.6	0.8	2.6	1.581	1.496	1.354	1.291
M1.8	0.8	2.6	1.781	1.696	1.554	1.491
M2	1	3	1.981	1.886	1.721	1.654
M2.2	1.3	3.8	2.180	2.080	1.888	1.817
M2.5	1.3	3.8	2.480	2.380	2.118	2.117
M3	1.5	4.5	2.980	2.874	2.655	2.580
M3.5	1.7	5	3.479	3.354	3.089	3.004
M4	2	6	3.978	3.838	3.523	3.433
M5	2.5	7.5	4.976	4.826	4.456	4.361
M6	3	12	5.974	5.794	5.324	5.212
M7	3	3	6.974	6.794	6.324	6.212
M8	4	12	7.972	7.760	7.160	7.042
M10	5	15	9.968	9.732	8.994	8.862
M12	6	18	11.966	11.701	10.829	10.679
M14	8	24	13.962	13.682	12.663	12.503
M16	8	24	15.962	15.682	14.663	14.503
M18	10	30	17.958	17.623	16.334	16.164
M20	10	30	19.958	19.623	18.334	18.164
M22	10	30	21.958	21.623	20.334	20.164
M24	12	36	23.952	23.577	22.003	21.803
M27	12	36	26.952	26.577	25.003	24.803
M30	15	45	29.947	29.522	27.674	27.462
M33	15	45	32.947	32.522	30.674	30.462
M36	18	53	35.940	35.465	33.342	33.118
M39	18	53	38.940	38.465	36.342	36.118

Limits for metric fine threads according to ISO 965:

Thread Size	Engagement length		Major diameter		Pitch diameter	
in mm	from	to	max.	min.	max.	min.
M8x1	3	9	7.974	7.794	7.324	7.212
M10x1.25	4	12	9.972	9.760	9.160	9.042
M12x1.25	4.5	13	11.972	11.760	11.160	11.028
M14x1.5	5.6	16	13.968	13.732	12.994	12.854
M16x1.5	5.6	16	15.968	15.732	14.994	14.854
M18x1.5	5.6	16	17.968	17.732	16.994	16.854
M20x1.5	5.6	16	19.968	19.732	18.994	18.854
M22x1.5	5.6	16	21.968	21.732	20.994	20.854
M24x2	8.5	25	23.962	23.682	22.663	22.493
M27x2	8.5	25	26.962	26.682	25.663	25.493
M30x2	8.5	25	29.962	29.682	28.663	28.493
M33x2	8.5	25	32.962	32.682	31.663	31.493
M36x3	12	36	35.952	35.577	34.003	33.803
M39x3	12	36	38.952	38.577	37.003	36.803

== Parts ==
The standard consists of the following parts:

- ISO 965-1 Principles and basic data
- ISO 965-2 Limits of sizes for general purpose external and internal screw threads – Medium quality
- ISO 965-3 Deviations for constructional screw threads
- ISO 965-4 Limits of sizes for hot-dip galvanized external screw threads to mate with internal screw threads tapped with tolerance position H or G after galvanizing
- ISO 965-5 Limits of sizes for internal screw threads to mate with hot-dip galvanized external screw threads with maximum size of tolerance position h before galvanizing
