= William Sellers =

American engineer, inventor, and businessperson

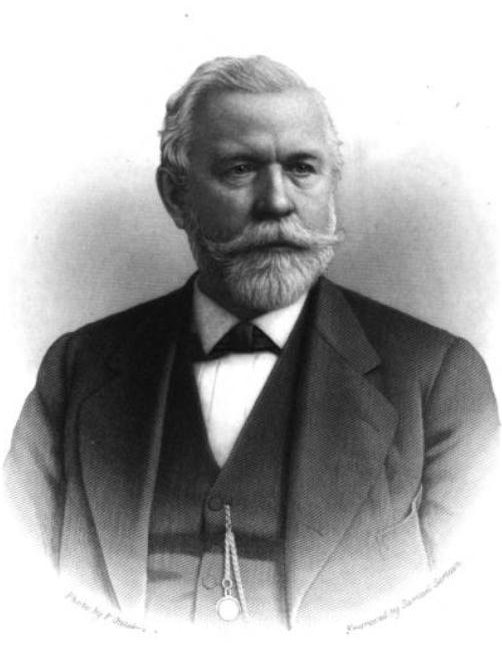
- Sellers in 1884
- Born: September 19, 1824; Upper Darby Township, Pennsylvania
- Died: January 24, 1905 (aged 80); Philadelphia, Pennsylvania
- Known for: proposing United States standard system of screws, threads, and nuts
- Spouses: Mary Ferris; Amélie Haaszm

Signature
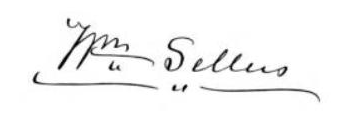

William Sellers (September 19, 1824 – January 24, 1905) was a mechanical engineer, manufacturer, businessman, noted abolitionist, and inventor who filed more than 90 patents, most notably the design for the United States standard screw thread, the standard bolt and machine screw thread still used today. As president of the Franklin Institute in Philadelphia, Pennsylvania, Sellers proposed the adoption of a system of screw threads which was easier for ordinary mechanics and machinists to cut than a similar design by Joseph Whitworth. For many years, he led the machine tool firm of William Sellers & Co., which was a very influential machine tool builder during the latter half of the 19th century.

== Family ==
Sellers was born in Upper Darby Township, Pennsylvania, to John and Elizabeth (Poole) Sellers, into a Quaker family full of industrial and manufacturing innovators. His cousins include George Escol Sellers (1808–1899), an inventor holding patents for a hill-climbing locomotive, a pulp-paper process, converting steamboats to coal, and removing brine from salt water, and Coleman Sellers II (1827–1907), a five-term president of the Franklin Institute, who was instrumental in harnessing Niagara Falls for electricity.

Sellers was married in 1849 to Mary Ferris (1820–1870), with whom he had three children, Katherine (1852–1917), William (1856–1933), and Frances (1858–1859). He married again in 1873 to Amélie Haaszm (1842–1929), with whom he had another three children, Alexander (1875–1957), Richard (1881–1942), and Christine (1882–-1884). He died in his hometown on January 24, 1905, at the age of 81.

== Career ==
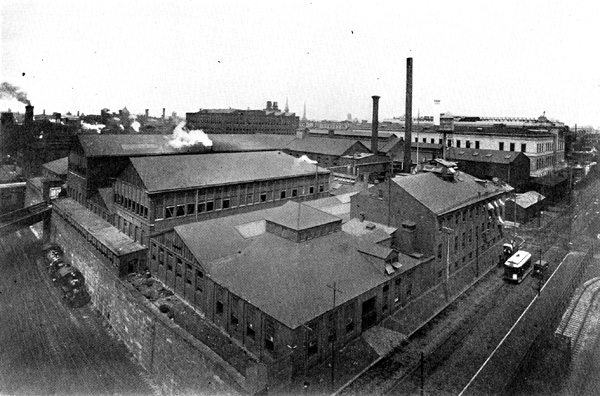
William Sellers & Co. Pennsylvania Avenue, Hamilton, 16th and 17th Streets

After receiving a private education in a family-run school, he began apprenticing at age fourteen with his uncle, J. Morton Poole, in a machine shop near Wilmington, Delaware. After seven years, he moved to Providence, Rhode Island, to run the shops of what eventually became the Corliss Steam Engine Company. Returning to West Philadelphia to start his own machine company, he eventually formed a partnership with his brother-in-law Edward Bancroft (1811–1855) in 1848. After Bancroft's death in 1855, Sellers incorporated as William Sellers & Co., which continued to operate until 1947 when it was sold to the Consolidated Machine Tool Corporation and relocated to Rochester, New York.

In 1847 Sellers was elected a member of the Franklin Institute, where he served as a member of the Board of Managers from 1857 to 1861 and again from 1864 to 1892, and as president from 1864 to 1867. At a meeting on September 15, 1864, he presented a uniform system of screw threads which with its angle and its flat top and bottom differed from Whitworth's British standard. Within a few years, the system had been adopted by the government workshops, leading railroad companies, prominent machine tool builders and others, under the various names of the United States, Sellers, or Franklin Institute Systems.

== Positions ==
- American Philosophical Society - elected member (1864)
- Franklin Institute - elected president (1864)
- University of Pennsylvania - elected trustee (1866)
- Fairmount Park - appointed member of the first commission (1868)
- Edgemoor Iron Company - elected president (1868)
- Philadelphia, Wilmington and Baltimore Railroad - elected director (1868)
- Philadelphia and Reading Railroad - director
- Centennial Exposition, Board of Finance - elected vice-president (1873)
- William Butcher Steel Works (reorganized it as Midvale Steel Company) - president (1873–87)
- National Academy of Sciences in Washington - elected member (1873)
- Société d'encouragement pour l'industrie nationale in Paris - appointed member (1875)

== Awards ==
- Paris Exposition of 1867 - gold medal
- Vienna Exposition of 1873 - Grand Diploma of Honor and five gold medals
- Paris Exposition of 1889 - Grand Prix, Chevalier de la Légion d'honneur
