= ISO metric screw thread =

Hardware threading standard

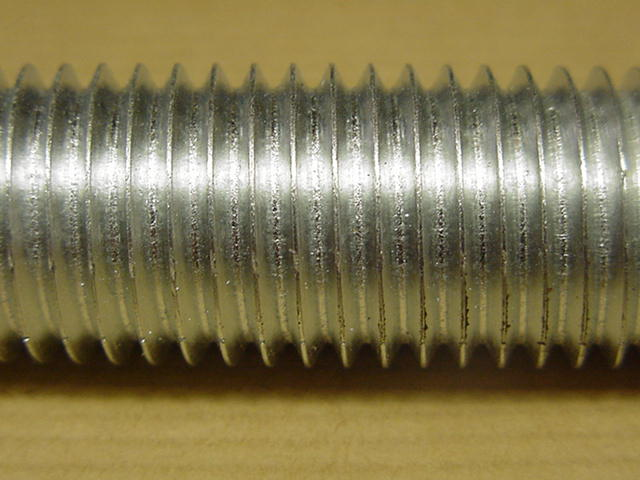
Profile of an M20 thread.

The ISO metric screw thread is the most commonly used type of general-purpose screw thread worldwide. They were one of the first international standards agreed when the International Organization for Standardization (ISO) was set up in 1947.

The "M" designation for metric screws indicates the nominal outer diameter of the screw thread, in millimetres. This is also referred to as the "major" diameter in the information below. It indicates the diameter of smooth-walled hole that an externally threaded component (e.g. on a bolt) will pass through easily to connect to an internally threaded component (e.g. a nut) on the other side. For example, an M6 screw has a nominal outer diameter of 6 millimetres and will therefore be a well-located, co-axial fit in a hole drilled to 6 mm diameter.

== Basic profile ==
Basic profile, or thread angle, of all ISO metric screw threads, where the male part has the external thread

The design principles of ISO general-purpose metric screw threads ("M" series threads) are defined in international standard ISO 68-1. Each thread is characterized by its major diameter, D (D_{maj} in the diagram), and its pitch, P. ISO metric threads consist of a symmetric V-shaped thread. In a cross-section along the thread axis, the sides of the V have an angle of 60° to each other. The thread depth is 0.54125 × pitch. The outermost 1/8 and the innermost 1/4 of the height H of the V-shape are cut off from the profile.

The relationship between the height H and the pitch P is found using the following equation where θ is half the included angle of the thread, in this case 30°:

$$H  = \frac {1}{\tan\theta} \cdot \frac {P}{2} = \frac{\sqrt 3}{2}\cdot
P \approx 0.8660 \cdot P$$

or

$$P  = 2\tan\theta\cdot H = \frac {2}{\sqrt 3} \cdot H \approx 1.1547 \cdot H$$

Because only 5/8 of this height is cut, the difference between major and minor diameters is 5/4 × 0.8660 × P = 1.0825 × P, so the tap drill size can be approximated by subtracting the thread pitch from the major diameter.

In an external (male) thread (e.g. on a bolt), the major diameter D_{maj} and the minor diameter D_{min} define maximum dimensions of the thread. This means that the external thread must end flat at D_{maj}, but can be rounded out below the minor diameter D_{min}. Conversely, in an internal (female) thread (e.g. in a nut), the major and minor diameters are minimum dimensions; therefore the thread profile must end flat at D_{min} but may be rounded out beyond D_{maj}. In practice this means that one can measure the diameter over the threads of a bolt to find the nominal diameter D_{maj}, and the inner diameter of a nut is D_{min}.

The minor diameter D_{min} and effective pitch diameter D_{p} are derived from the major diameter and pitch as

$$\begin{align}
D_\text{min} &= D_\text{maj} - 2\cdot\frac58\cdot H = D_\text{maj} - \frac{ 5 {\sqrt 3}}{8}\cdot P \approx D_\text{maj} - 1.082532 \cdot P \\[3pt]
D_\text{p} &= D_\text{maj} - 2\cdot\frac38\cdot H = D_\text{maj} - \frac{ 3 {\sqrt 3}}{8}\cdot P \approx D_\text{maj} - 0.649519 \cdot P
\end{align}$$

Tables of the derived dimensions for screw diameters and pitches defined in ISO 261 are given in ISO 724.

== Designation ==
A metric ISO screw thread is designated by the letter M followed by the value of the nominal diameter D (the maximum thread diameter) and the pitch P, both expressed in millimetres and separated by a dash or sometimes the multiplication sign, × (e.g. M8-1.25 or M8×1.25). If the pitch is the normally used "coarse" pitch listed in ISO 261 or ISO 262, it can be omitted (e.g. M8).

The length of a machine screw or bolt is indicated by an × and the length expressed in millimetres (e.g. M8-1.25×30 or M8×30).

Tolerance classes defined in ISO 965-1 can be appended to these designations, if required (e.g. M500– 6g in external threads). External threads are designated by lowercase letter, g or h. Internal threads are designated by upper case letters, G or H.

== Preferred sizes ==
ISO 261 specifies a detailed list of preferred combinations of outer diameter D and pitch P for ISO metric screw threads. ISO 262 specifies a shorter list of thread dimensions – a subset of ISO 261.

ISO 262 selected sizes for screws, bolts and nuts
Nominal diameter (mm)	Series	Pitch (mm)		Nominal diameter (mm)	Series	Pitch (mm)	
Nominal diameter (mm)	Series	Coarse	Fine	Nominal diameter (mm)	Series	Coarse	Fine
1	R10	0.25	0.2	︙			
1.2	R10	0.25	0.2	16	R10	2	1.5
1.4	R20	0.3	0.2	18	R20	2.5	2 or 1.5
1.6	R10	0.35	0.2	20	R10	2.5	2 or 1.5
1.8	R20	0.35	0.2	22	R20	2.5	2 or 1.5
2	R10	0.4	0.25	24	R10	3	2
2.5	R10	0.45	0.35	27	R20	3	2
3	R10	0.5	0.35	30	R10	3.5	2
3.5	R20	0.6	0.35	33	R20	3.5	2
4	R10	0.7	0.5	36	R10	4	3
5	R10	0.8	0.5	39	R20	4	3
6	R10	1	0.75	42	R10	4.5	3
7	R20	1	0.75	45	R20	4.5	3
8	R10	1.25	1 or 0.75	48	R10	5	3
10	R10	1.5	1.25 or 1	52	R20	5	4
12	R10	1.75	1.5 or 1.25	56	R10	5.5	4
14	R20	2	1.5	60	R20	5.5	4
︙				64	R10	6	4

The thread values are derived from rounded Renard series. They are defined in ISO 3, with "1st choice" sizes being from the Rˈˈ10 series and "2nd choice" and "3rd choice" sizes being the remaining values from the Rˈˈ20 series.

The coarse pitch is the commonly used default pitch for a given diameter. In addition, one or two smaller fine pitches are defined, for use in applications where the height of the normal coarse pitch would be unsuitable (e.g. threads in thin-walled pipes). The terms coarse and fine have (in this context) no relation to the manufacturing quality of the thread.

In addition to coarse and fine threads, there is another division of extra fine, or superfine threads, with a very fine pitch thread. Superfine pitch metric threads are occasionally used in automotive components, such as suspension struts, and are commonly used in the aviation manufacturing industry. This is because extra fine threads are more resistant to coming loose from vibrations. Fine and superfine threads also have a greater minor diameter than coarse threads, which means the bolt or stud has a greater cross-sectional area (and therefore greater load-carrying capability) for the same nominal diameter.

== Heritage pre ISO DIN sizes ==
Obsolete DIN sizes for historical purposes DIN 13, Din 13-1
Nominal diameter (mm)	Pitch (mm)		Nominal diameter (mm)	Pitch (mm)	
Nominal diameter (mm)	Coarse	Fine	Nominal diameter (mm)	Coarse	Fine
1.1	0.25	-	︙		
1.7	0.35	-	4.5	0.75	-
2.2	0.4 ?	-	5.5	0.9	-
2.3	0.4	-	9	1.25	-
2.6	0.45	-	11	1.5	-
︙			15	2	-

== Japanese pre-1967 standard ==
Japan had a JIS (Japanese Industrial Standard) metric screw thread standard that largely followed the ISO, but with some differences in pitch and head sizes. (This may help explain why some metric screws don't seem to fit on a motorcycle or car.)

In April 1967 the JIS was changed to match the screw pitches of the ISO standard.

JIS pre April 1967 screw pitches and ISO screw pitches
Nominal diameter (mm)	Pitch (mm)	ISO Pitch (mm)
3	0.6	0.5
4	0.75	0.7
5	0.9	0.8
6	1.0	1.0
8	1.00	1.25
10	1.25	1.5
12	1.5	1.75

== Spanner (wrench) sizes ==
Below are some common spanner (wrench) sizes for metric screw threads. Hexagonal (generally abbreviated to "hex") head widths (width across flats, spanner size) are for DIN 934 hex nuts and hex head bolts. Other (usually smaller) sizes may occur to reduce weight or cost, including the small series flange bolts defined in ISO 4162 which typically have hexagonal head sizes corresponding to the smaller first choice thread size (for example, M6 small series flange bolts have 8 mm hexagonal heads, as would normally be found on M5 bolts).

Thread	Spanner (wrench) size (mm)				
Thread	Hex nut, and bolt		Socket-head cap screw	: Button-head cap screw; Counter-sunk flat-head cap screw	Set, or grub, screw
Thread	ISO	DIN	Socket-head cap screw	: Button-head cap screw; Counter-sunk flat-head cap screw	Set, or grub, screw
M1	-	2.5	-	-	-
M1.2	-	3	-	-	-
M1.4	-	3	1.25	-	0.7
M1.6	3.2		1.5	0.9	0.7
M2	4		1.5	1.25	0.9
M2.5	5		2	1.5	1.3
M3	5.5		2.5	2	1.5
M3.5	6		-	-	-
M4	7		3	2.5	2
M5	8		4	3	2.5
M6	10		5	4	3
M7	11		-	-	-
M8	13		6	5	4
M10	16	17	8	6	5
M12	18	19	10	8	6
M14	21	22	10	-	-
M16	24		14	10	8
M18	27		14	12	-
M20	30		17	12	10
M22	34	32	17	14	-
M24	36		19	14	12
M27	41		19	17	14
M30	46		22	17	14
M33	50		24	-	-
M36	55		27	-	-
M39	60		-	-	-
M42	65		32	-	-
M45	70		-	-	-
M48	75		36	-	-
M52	80		36	-	-
M56	85		41	-	-
M60	90		-	-	-
M64	95		46	-	-

== Standards ==
=== International ===
- ISO 68-1: ISO general purpose screw threads — Basic profile — Metric screw threads.
- ISO 261: ISO general purpose metric screw threads — General plan.
- ISO 262: ISO general purpose metric screw threads — Selected sizes for screws, bolts and nuts.
- ISO 965: ISO general purpose metric screw threads — Tolerances
  - ISO 965-1: Principles and basic data
  - ISO 965-2: Limits of sizes for general purpose external and internal screw threads.
  - ISO 965-3: Deviations for constructional screw threads
  - ISO 965-4: Limits of sizes for hot-dip galvanized external screw threads to mate with internal screw threads tapped with tolerance position H or G after galvanizing
  - ISO 965-5: Limits of sizes for internal screw threads to mate with hot-dip galvanized external screw threads with maximum size of tolerance position h before galvanizing

=== National ===
- BS 3643: ISO metric screw threads
- ANSI/ASME B1.13M: Metric Screw Threads: M Profile
- ANSI/ASME B4.2-1978 (R2009): Preferred Metric Limits and Fits
- DIN13, page 519

== See also ==
- ASTM A325M
- ASTM F568M
- British Association screw threads (BA)
- British Standard Cycle (BSC)
- British standard fine thread (BSF)
- British standard pipe thread (BSP)
- British Standard Whitworth (BSW) – a British thread standard with 55° thread angle.
- Buttress thread
- Engineering tolerance
- Garden hose thread
- List of DIN standards
- List of drill and tap sizes
- Löwenherz thread
- National pipe thread (NPT)
- National thread
- Nominal size
- Panzergewinde
- Photographic Filter thread
- Preferred metric sizes
- Screw thread
- Square thread form
- Thread angle
- Trapezoidal thread forms
- Thury thread
- United States Standard thread
- Unified Thread Standard (UTS, UNC, UNF, UNEF and UNS) – a US/Canadian/British thread standard that uses the same 60° thread angle as metric threads, but an inch-based set of diameter/pitch combinations.
