= United States Standard thread =

Standard for threaded fasteners and washers

United States Standard thread (USS thread), also known as Sellers Standard thread, Franklin Institute thread and American Standard thread, is a standard for inch based threaded fasteners and washers.

The USS standard is no longer supported. It, together with the SAE fastener standard, was incorporated into the Unified Thread Standard. However, the term, USS, continues to be used occasionally today to describe inch based threaded fasteners with a coarse thread pitch and inch based washers that are a little bit larger than the corresponding SAE washer. The Unified Thread Standard uses the term UNC (Unified Coarse) to describe a fastener that previously would have been designated USS and UNF (Unified Fine) to describe a fastener that would have previously been designated SAE.

== Thread form ==
The thread form is defined by flats at the tip and root of the thread form. This flat length is defined as the pitch divided by eight. The thread depth, which is from flat to flat is 0.6495 times the pitch. For 1/4-inch (6.4 mm) screws and larger, the pitch is defined as:

$$P = 0.24 \sqrt {D + 0.625} - 0.175$$

where P is the pitch and D is the diameter of the rough stock.

== Background ==
William Sellers originally developed the USS thread, and set forth many of its details in his paper, "A System of Screw Threads and Nuts", presented in April 1864 to the Franklin Institute. In 1898, the standard for metric threaded fasteners was established.

The metric standard used the same thread geometry as the USS standard but differed in that the dimensions and pitch were based on metric units. In 1906, the A.L.A.M developed what would be the SAE thread standard for threaded fasteners based on the USS standard but with a finer thread pitch.

A Unified Thread Standard UNC thread is mechanically interchangeable with a USS thread of the same diameter. However, there are tolerance and other differences between a thread compliant with the USS thread and a Unified Thread Standard UNC thread. The Unified Thread Standard for quarter inch and larger threaded fasteners was adopted on November 18, 1948, and was subsequently adopted for smaller thread series.

== See also ==
- Screw
- Screw thread
- Unified Thread Standard
- ISO metric screw thread
- British Standard Whitworth
