= Drill bit sizes =

Standard cutting tool sizes

Drill bits are the cutting tools of drilling machines. They can be made in any size to order, but standards organizations have defined sets of sizes that are produced routinely by drill bit manufacturers and stocked by distributors.

In the U.S., fractional inch and gauge drill bit sizes are in common use. In nearly all other countries, metric drill bit sizes are most common, and all others are anachronisms or are reserved for dealing with designs from the US. The British Standards on replacing gauge size drill bits with metric sizes in the UK was first published in 1959.

A comprehensive table for metric, fractional wire and tapping sizes can be found at the drill and tap size chart.

== Metric drill bit sizes ==
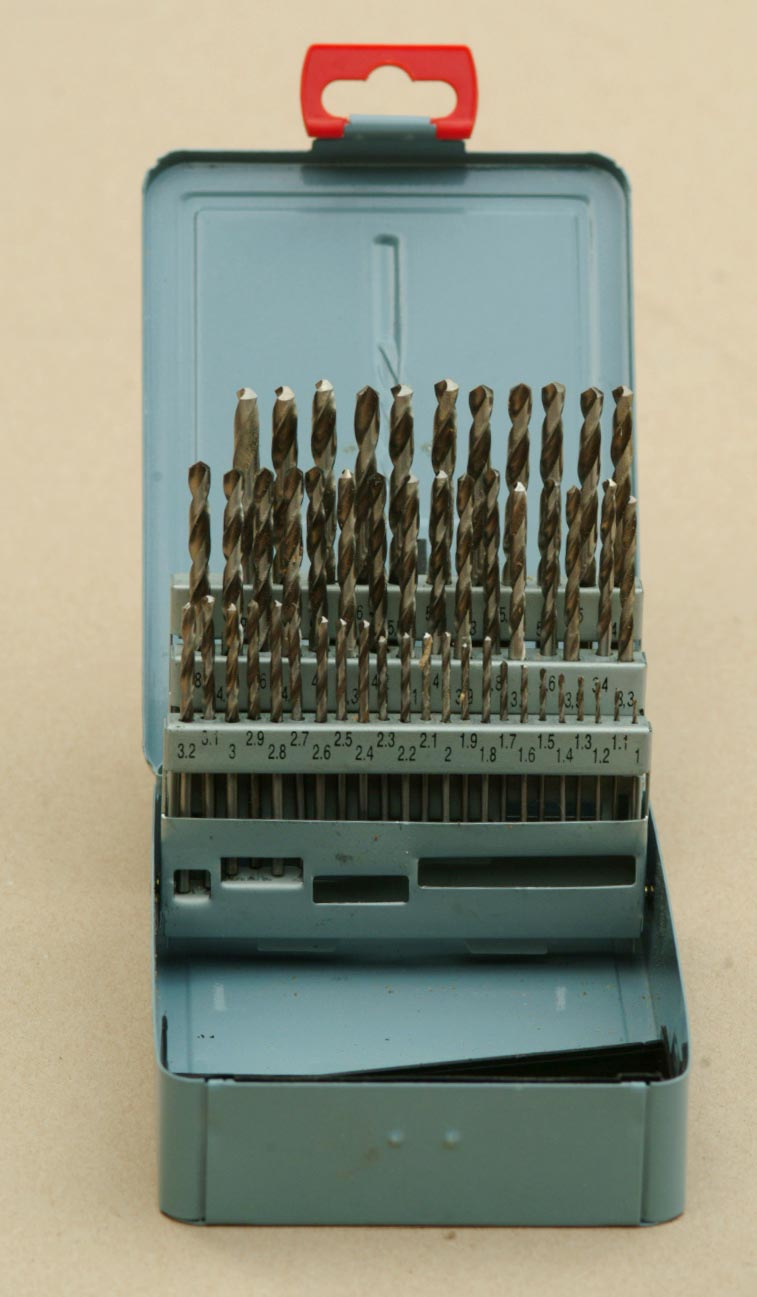
Metric drill set, 1.0–6.0 mm by 0.1 mm, jobber length. The case that holds them in an indexed order (by size), via a graduated series of holes, is called a drill index.

Metric drill bit sizes define the diameter of the bit in terms of standard metric lengths. Standards organizations define sets of sizes that are conventionally manufactured and stocked. For example, British Standard BS 328 defines 230 sizes from 0.2 mm to 25.0 mm.

From 0.2 through 0.98 mm, sizes are defined as follows, where N is an integer from 2 through 9:

- N · 0.1 mm
- N · 0.1 + 0.02 mm
- N · 0.1 + 0.05 mm
- N · 0.1 + 0.08 mm

From 1.0 through 2.95 mm, sizes are defined as follows, where N is an integer from 10 through 29:

- N · 0.1 mm
- N · 0.1 + 0.05 mm

From 3.0 through 13.9 mm, sizes are defined as follows, where N is an integer from 30 through 139:

- N · 0.1 mm

From 14.0 through 25.0 mm, sizes are defined as follows, where M is an integer from 14 through 25:

- M · 1 mm
- M · 1 + 0.25 mm
- M · 1 + 0.5 mm
- M · 1 + 0.75 mm

In smaller sizes, bits are available in smaller diameter increments. This reflects both the smaller drilled hole diameter tolerance possible on smaller holes and the wishes of designers to have drill bit sizes available within at most 10% of an arbitrary hole size.

The price and availability of particular size bits does not change uniformly across the size range. Bits at size increments of 1 mm are most commonly available, and lowest price. Sets of bits in 1 mm increments might be found on a market stall. In 0.5 mm increments, any hardware store. In 0.1 mm increments, any engineers' store. Sets are not commonly available in smaller size increments, except for drill bits below 1 mm diameter. Drill bits of the less routinely used sizes, such as 2.55 mm, would have to be ordered from a specialist drill bit supplier. This subsetting of standard sizes is in contrast to general practice with number gauge drill bits, where it is rare to find a set on the market which does not contain every gauge.

There are also Renard series sequences of preferred metric drill bits:

- R5 (factor 1.58) : M2.5, M4, M6, M10, M16, M24
- R10 (factor 1.26): M3, M5, M8, M12, M20, M30

Metric dimensioning is routinely used for drill bits of all types, although the details of BS 328 apply only to twist drill bits. For example, a set of Forstner bits may contain 10, 15, 20, 25 and 30 mm diameter cutters.

== Fractional-inch drill bit sizes ==
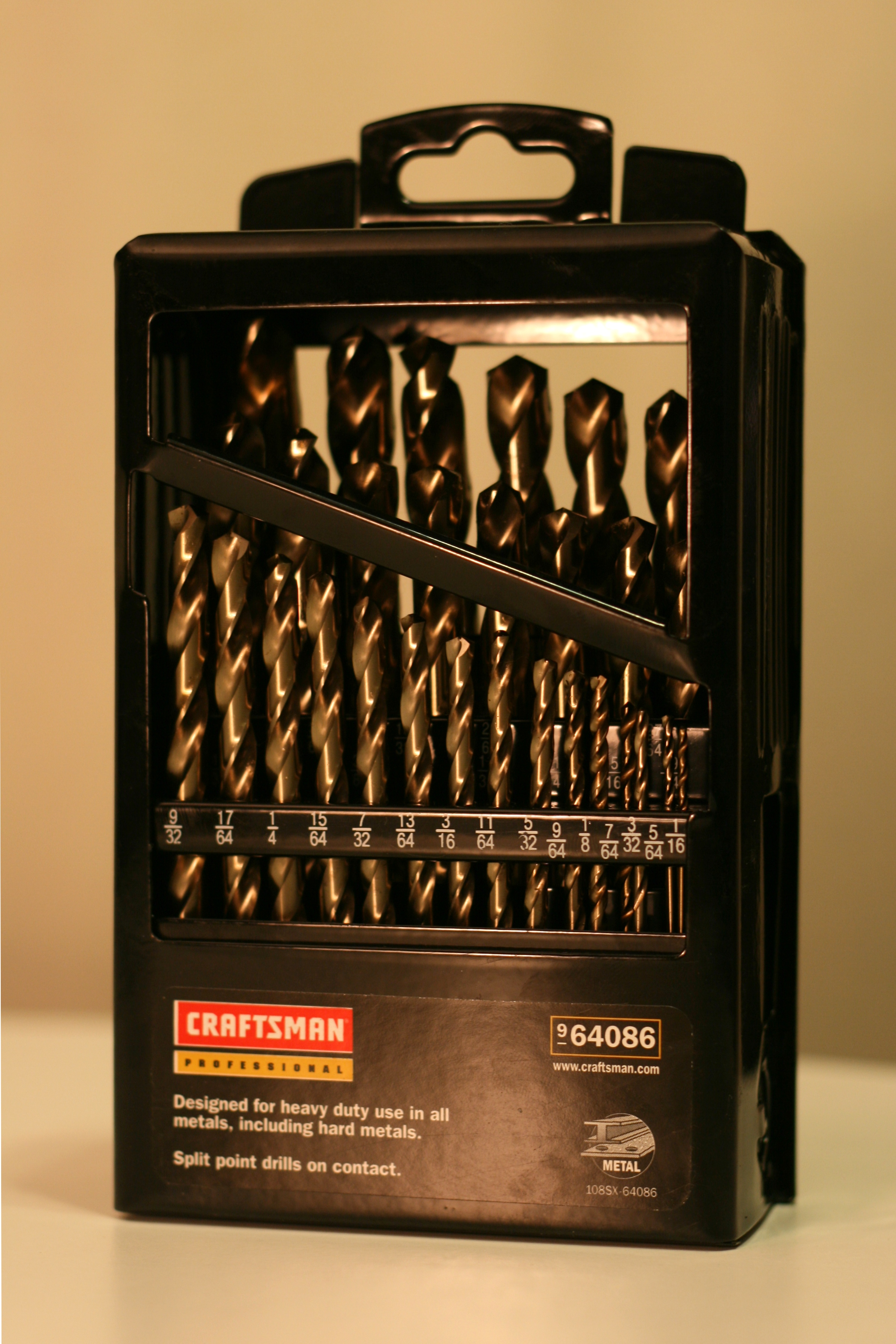
Fractional drill bit set by Craftsman

Fractional-inch drill bit sizes are still in common use in the United States and in any factory (around the globe) that makes inch-sized products for the U.S. market.

ANSI B94.11M-1979 sets size standards for jobber-length straight-shank twist drill bits from 1/64 inch through 1 inch in 1/64-inch increments. For Morse taper-shank drill bits, the standard continues in 1/64-inch increments up to 1 3/4 inches, then 1/32-inch increments up to 2 1/4 inches, 1/16-inch increments up to 3 inches, 1/8-inch increments up to 3 1/4 inches, and a single 1/4-inch increment to 3 1/2 inches. One aspect of this method of sizing is that the size increment between drill bits becomes larger as bit sizes get smaller: 100% for the step from 1/64 to 1/32, but a much smaller percentage between 1 47/64 and 1 3/4.

Drill bit sizes are written as irreducible fractions. So, instead of 78/64 inches, or 1 14/64 inches, the size is noted as 1 7/32 inches.

Below is a chart providing the decimal-fraction equivalents that are most relevant to fractional-inch drill bit sizes (that is, 0 to 1 by 64ths). (Decimal places for .25, .5, and .75 are shown to thousandths [.250, .500, .750], which is how machinists usually think about them ["two-fifty", "five hundred", "seven-fifty"]. Machinists generally truncate the decimals after thousandths; for example, a 27/64-inch drill bit may be referred to in shop-floor speech as a "four-twenty-one drill".)

=== Decimal-fraction equivalents ===
Decimal-fraction equivalents

| fraction | in | mm |
|---|---|---|
| 1/64 | 0.015625 | 0.396875 |
| 1/32 | 0.03125 | 0.79375 |
| 3/64 | 0.046875 | 1.190625 |
| 1/16 | 0.0625 | 1.5875 |
| 5/64 | 0.078125 | 1.984375 |
| 3/32 | 0.09375 | 2.38125 |
| 7/64 | 0.109375 | 2.778125 |
| 1/8 | 0.125 | 3.175 |
| 9/64 | 0.140625 | 3.571875 |
| 5/32 | 0.15625 | 3.96875 |
| 11/64 | 0.171875 | 4.365625 |
| 3/16 | 0.1875 | 4.7625 |
| 13/64 | 0.203125 | 5.159375 |
| 7/32 | 0.21875 | 5.55625 |
| 15/64 | 0.234375 | 5.953125 |
| 1/4 | 0.250 | 6.350 |

| fraction | in | mm |
|---|---|---|
| 17/64 | 0.265625 | 6.746875 |
| 9/32 | 0.28125 | 7.14375 |
| 19/64 | 0.296875 | 7.540625 |
| 5/16 | 0.3125 | 7.9375 |
| 21/64 | 0.328125 | 8.334375 |
| 11/32 | 0.34375 | 8.73125 |
| 23/64 | 0.359375 | 9.128125 |
| 3/8 | 0.375 | 9.525 |
| 25/64 | 0.390625 | 9.921875 |
| 13/32 | 0.40625 | 10.31875 |
| 27/64 | 0.421875 | 10.715625 |
| 7/16 | 0.4375 | 11.1125 |
| 29/64 | 0.453125 | 11.509375 |
| 15/32 | 0.46875 | 11.90625 |
| 31/64 | 0.484375 | 12.303125 |
| 1/2 | 0.500 | 12.700 |

| fraction | in | mm |
|---|---|---|
| 33/64 | 0.515625 | 13.096875 |
| 17/32 | 0.53125 | 13.49375 |
| 35/64 | 0.546875 | 13.890625 |
| 9/16 | 0.5625 | 14.2875 |
| 37/64 | 0.578125 | 14.684375 |
| 19/32 | 0.59375 | 15.08125 |
| 39/64 | 0.609375 | 15.478125 |
| 5/8 | 0.625 | 15.875 |
| 41/64 | 0.640625 | 16.271875 |
| 21/32 | 0.65625 | 16.66875 |
| 43/64 | 0.671875 | 17.065625 |
| 11/16 | 0.6875 | 17.4625 |
| 45/64 | 0.703125 | 17.859375 |
| 23/32 | 0.71875 | 18.25625 |
| 47/64 | 0.734375 | 18.653125 |
| 3/4 | 0.750 | 19.050 |

| fraction | in | mm |
|---|---|---|
| 49/64 | 0.765625 | 19.446875 |
| 25/32 | 0.78125 | 19.84375 |
| 51/64 | 0.796875 | 20.240625 |
| 13/16 | 0.8125 | 20.6375 |
| 53/64 | 0.828125 | 21.034375 |
| 27/32 | 0.84375 | 21.43125 |
| 55/64 | 0.859375 | 21.828125 |
| 7/8 | 0.875 | 22.225 |
| 57/64 | 0.890625 | 22.621875 |
| 29/32 | 0.90625 | 23.01875 |
| 59/64 | 0.921875 | 23.415625 |
| 15/16 | 0.9375 | 23.8125 |
| 61/64 | 0.953125 | 24.209375 |
| 31/32 | 0.96875 | 24.60625 |
| 63/64 | 0.984375 | 25.003125 |
| 1 | 1.000 | 25.400 |

== Number and letter gauge drill bit sizes ==
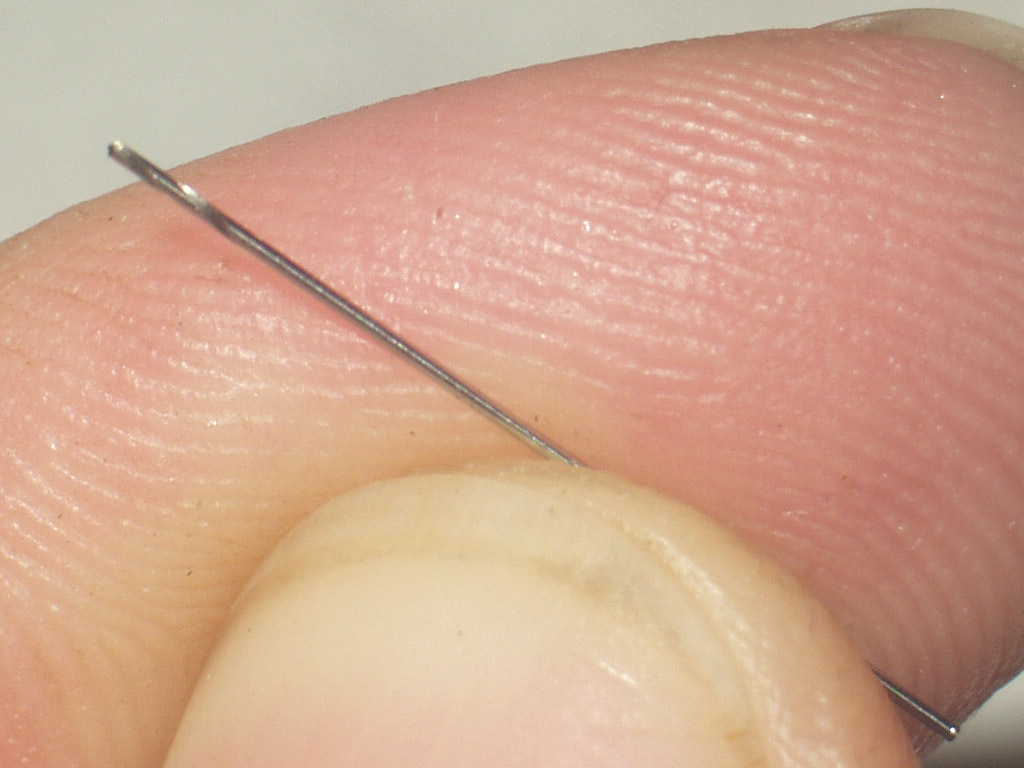
A #80 drill bit

Number drill bit gauge sizes range from size 80 (the smallest) to size 1 (the largest) followed by letter gauge size A (the smallest) to size Z (the largest). Although the ASME B94.11M twist drill standard, for example, lists sizes as small as size 97, sizes smaller than 80 are rarely encountered in practice.

Number and letter sizes are commonly used for twist drill bits rather than other drill forms, as the range encompasses the sizes for which twist drill bits are most often used.

The gauge-to-diameter ratio is not defined by a formula; it is based on—but is not identical to—the Stubs Steel Wire Gauge, which originated in Britain during the 19th century. The accompanying graph illustrates the change in diameter with change in gauge, as well as the reduction in step size as the gauge size decreases. Each step along the horizontal axis is one gauge size.

Number and letter gauge drill bits are still in common use in the U.S. and to a lesser extent the UK, where they have largely been supplanted by metric sizes. Other countries that formerly used the number series have for the most part also abandoned these in favour of metric sizes.

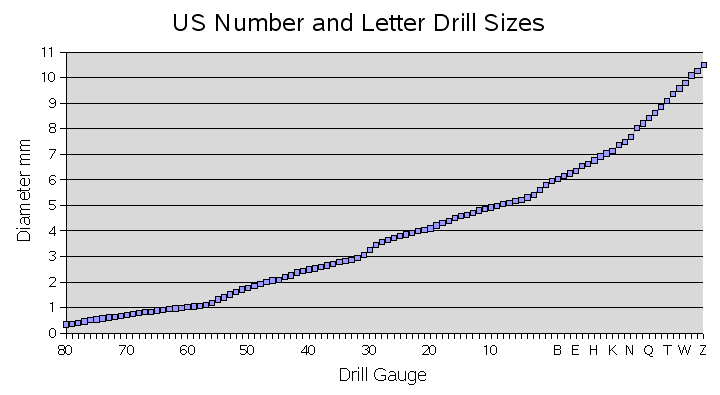

== Drill bit conversion table ==
click to see a ruler comparing millimeters to fractions of an inch

| gauge | in | mm |
|---|---|---|
| 104 | 0.0031 | 0.079 |
| 103 | 0.0035 | 0.089 |
| 102 | 0.0039 | 0.099 |
| 101 | 0.0043 | 0.109 |
| 100 | 0.0047 | 0.119 |
| 99 | 0.0051 | 0.130 |
| 98 | 0.0055 | 0.140 |
| 97 | 0.0059 | 0.150 |
| 96 | 0.0063 | 0.160 |
| 95 | 0.0067 | 0.170 |
| 94 | 0.0071 | 0.180 |
| 93 | 0.0075 | 0.191 |
| 92 | 0.0079 | 0.201 |
| 91 | 0.0083 | 0.211 |
| 90 | 0.0087 | 0.221 |
| 89 | 0.0091 | 0.231 |
| 88 | 0.0095 | 0.241 |
| 87 | 0.010 | 0.254 |
| 86 | 0.0105 | 0.267 |
| 85 | 0.011 | 0.279 |
| 84 | 0.0115 | 0.292 |
| 83 | 0.012 | 0.305 |
| 82 | 0.0125 | 0.318 |
| 81 | 0.013 | 0.330 |
| 80 | 0.0135 | 0.343 |
| 79 | 0.0145 | 0.368 |

| gauge | in | mm |
|---|---|---|
| 78 | 0.016 | 0.406 |
| 77 | 0.018 | 0.457 |
| 76 | 0.020 | 0.508 |
| 75 | 0.021 | 0.533 |
| 74 | 0.0225 | 0.572 |
| 73 | 0.024 | 0.610 |
| 72 | 0.025 | 0.635 |
| 71 | 0.026 | 0.660 |
| 70 | 0.028 | 0.711 |
| 69 | 0.0292 | 0.742 |
| 68 | 0.031 | 0.787 |
| 67 | 0.032 | 0.813 |
| 66 | 0.033 | 0.838 |
| 65 | 0.035 | 0.889 |
| 64 | 0.036 | 0.914 |
| 63 | 0.037 | 0.940 |
| 62 | 0.038 | 0.965 |
| 61 | 0.039 | 0.991 |
| 60 | 0.040 | 1.016 |
| 59 | 0.041 | 1.041 |
| 58 | 0.042 | 1.067 |
| 57 | 0.043 | 1.092 |
| 56 | 0.0465 | 1.181 |
| 55 | 0.052 | 1.321 |
| 54 | 0.055 | 1.397 |
| 53 | 0.0595 | 1.511 |

| gauge | in | mm |
|---|---|---|
| 52 | 0.0635 | 1.613 |
| 51 | 0.067 | 1.702 |
| 50 | 0.070 | 1.778 |
| 49 | 0.073 | 1.854 |
| 48 | 0.076 | 1.930 |
| 47 | 0.0785 | 1.994 |
| 46 | 0.081 | 2.057 |
| 45 | 0.082 | 2.083 |
| 44 | 0.086 | 2.184 |
| 43 | 0.089 | 2.261 |
| 42 | 0.0935 | 2.375 |
| 41 | 0.096 | 2.438 |
| 40 | 0.098 | 2.489 |
| 39 | 0.0995 | 2.527 |
| 38 | 0.1015 | 2.578 |
| 37 | 0.104 | 2.642 |
| 36 | 0.1065 | 2.705 |
| 35 | 0.110 | 2.794 |
| 34 | 0.111 | 2.819 |
| 33 | 0.113 | 2.870 |
| 32 | 0.116 | 2.946 |
| 31 | 0.120 | 3.048 |
| 30 | 0.1285 | 3.264 |
| 29 | 0.136 | 3.454 |
| 28 | 0.1405 | 3.569 |
| 27 | 0.144 | 3.658 |

| gauge | in | mm |
|---|---|---|
| 26 | 0.147 | 3.734 |
| 25 | 0.1495 | 3.797 |
| 24 | 0.152 | 3.861 |
| 23 | 0.154 | 3.912 |
| 22 | 0.157 | 3.988 |
| 21 | 0.159 | 4.039 |
| 20 | 0.161 | 4.089 |
| 19 | 0.166 | 4.216 |
| 18 | 0.1695 | 4.305 |
| 17 | 0.173 | 4.394 |
| 16 | 0.177 | 4.496 |
| 15 | 0.180 | 4.572 |
| 14 | 0.182 | 4.623 |
| 13 | 0.185 | 4.699 |
| 12 | 0.189 | 4.801 |
| 11 | 0.191 | 4.851 |
| 10 | 0.1935 | 4.915 |
| 9 | 0.196 | 4.978 |
| 8 | 0.199 | 5.055 |
| 7 | 0.201 | 5.105 |
| 6 | 0.204 | 5.182 |
| 5 | 0.2055 | 5.220 |
| 4 | 0.209 | 5.309 |
| 3 | 0.213 | 5.410 |
| 2 | 0.221 | 5.613 |
| 1 | 0.228 | 5.791 |

| gauge | in | mm |
|---|---|---|
| A | 0.234 | 5.944 |
| B | 0.238 | 6.045 |
| C | 0.242 | 6.147 |
| D | 0.246 | 6.248 |
| E | 0.250 | 6.350 |
| F | 0.257 | 6.528 |
| G | 0.261 | 6.629 |
| H | 0.266 | 6.756 |
| I | 0.272 | 6.909 |
| J | 0.277 | 7.036 |
| K | 0.281 | 7.137 |
| L | 0.290 | 7.366 |
| M | 0.295 | 7.493 |
| N | 0.302 | 7.671 |
| O | 0.316 | 8.026 |
| P | 0.323 | 8.204 |
| Q | 0.332 | 8.433 |
| R | 0.339 | 8.611 |
| S | 0.348 | 8.839 |
| T | 0.358 | 9.093 |
| U | 0.368 | 9.347 |
| V | 0.377 | 9.576 |
| W | 0.386 | 9.804 |
| X | 0.397 | 10.08 |
| Y | 0.404 | 10.26 |
| Z | 0.413 | 10.49 |

== Screw-machine-length drill ==
The shortest standard-length drills (that is, lowest length-to-diameter ratio) are screw-machine-length drills (sometimes abbreviated S/M). They are named for their use in screw machines. Their shorter flute length and shorter overall length compared to a standard jobber bit results in a more rigid drill bit, reducing deflection and breakage. They are rarely available in retail hardware stores or home centers.

== Types of Drill Bits ==
- Twist Drills: Most common, general-purpose drilling
- Brad Point: Woodworking, precise holes
- Spade Bits: Fast, rough holes in wood
- Forstner Bits: Clean, flat-bottom holes
- Step Bits: Multiple diameter holes

== Jobber-length drill ==
Jobber-length drills are the most commonly found type of drill. The length of the flutes is between 9 and 14 times the diameter of the drill, depending on the drill size. So a 1/2 in (12.7 mm) diameter drill will be able to drill a hole 4 1/2 in (114.3 mm) deep, since it is 9 times the diameter in length. A 1/8 in (3.175 mm) diameter drill can drill a hole 1 5/8 in (41.275 mm) deep, since it is 13 times the diameter in flute length.

The term jobber refers to a wholesale distributor—a person or company that buys from manufacturers and sells to retailers. Manufacturers producing drill bits "for the trade" (as opposed to for specialized machining applications with particular length and design requirements) made ones of medium length suitable for a wide variety of jobs, because that was the type most desirable for general distribution. Thus, at the time that the name of jobber-length drill bits became common, it reflected the same concept that names like general-purpose and multipurpose reflect.

== Aircraft-length drill ==
Extended-reach or long-series drills are commonly called aircraft-length from their original use in manufacturing riveted aluminum aircraft. For bits thicker than a minimum size such as 1/8 inch (3.2 mm), they are available in fixed lengths such as 6, 8, 12 or 18 inches (152, 203, 305 or 457 mm) rather than the progressive lengths of jobber drills.

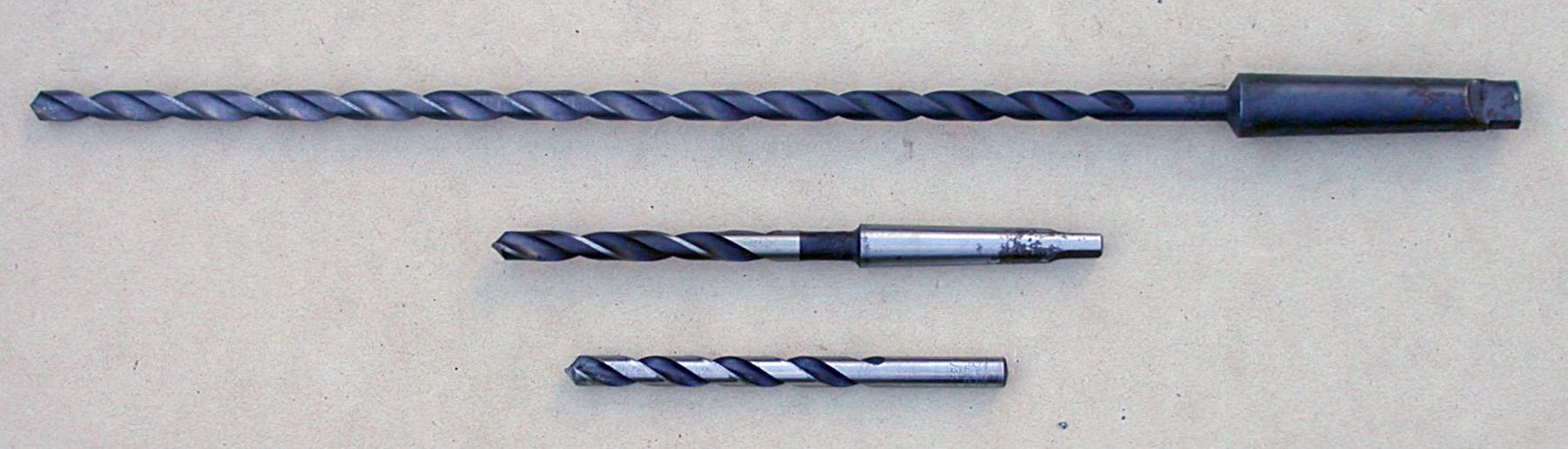
11/32-inch drills: long-series Morse, plain Morse, jobber

The image shows a long-series drill compared to its diametric equivalents, all are 11/32 inch (8.7 mm) in diameter. The equivalent Morse taper drill shown in the middle is of the usual length for a taper-shank drill. The lower drill bit is the jobber or parallel shank equivalent.

== Center drill bit sizes ==
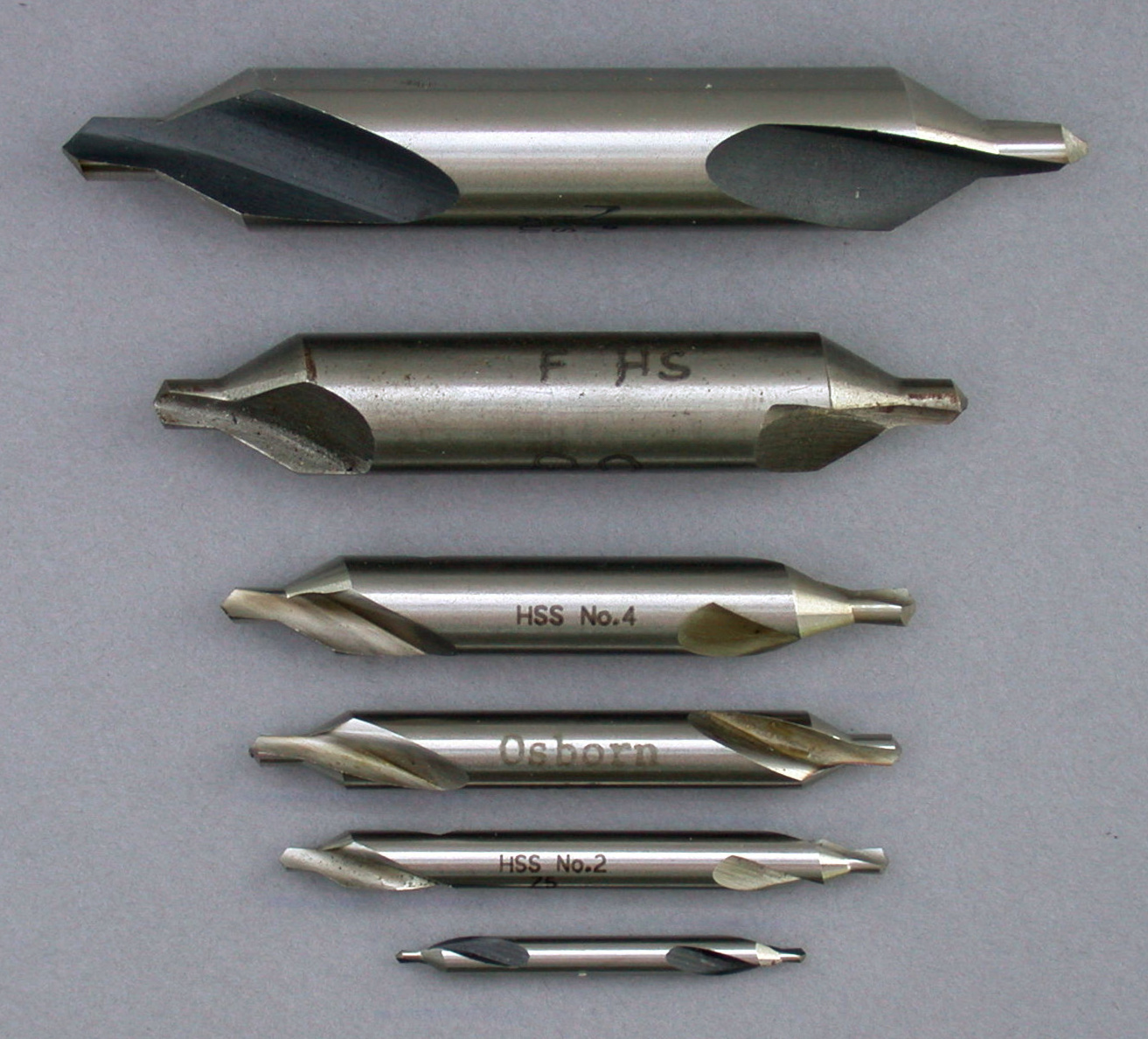
Center drills, numbers 1 (bottom) through to 6 (top)

Center drills are available with two different included angles; 60 degrees is the standard for drilling centre holes (for example for subsequent centre support in the lathe), but 90 degrees is also common and used when locating holes prior to drilling with twist drills. Center drills are made specifically for drilling lathe centers, but are often used as spotting drills because of their radial stiffness.

| Size designation | Drill diameter |
|---|---|
| 5/0 | 0.010 in (0.254 mm) |
| 4/0 | 0.015 in (0.381 mm) |
| 3/0 | 0.020 in (0.508 mm) |
| 2/0 | 0.025 in (0.635 mm) |
| 0 | 1/32 in (0.794 mm) |
| 1 | 3/64 in (1.191 mm) |
| 2 | 5/64 in (1.984 mm) |
| 3 | 7/64 in (2.778 mm) |
| 4 | 1/8 in (3.175 mm) |
| 4½ | 9/64 in (3.572 mm) |
| 5 | 3/16 in (4.763 mm) |
| 6 | 7/32 in (5.556 mm) |
| 7 | 1/4 in (6.350 mm) |
| 8 | 5/16 in (7.938 mm) |

| Gauge | Body diameter |
|---|---|
| BS1 | 1/8 in (3.175 mm) |
| BS2 | 3/16 in (4.763 mm) |
| BS3 | 1/4 in (6.350 mm) |
| BS4 | 5/16 in (7.938 mm) |
| BS5 | 7/16 in (11.113 mm) |
| BS5A | 1/2 in (12.700 mm) |
| BS6 | 5/8 in (15.875 mm) |
| BS7 | 3/4 in (19.050 mm) |

== Spotting drill bit sizes ==
Spotting drills are available in a relatively small range of sizes, both metric and imperial, as their purpose is to provide a precise spot for guiding a standard twist drill. Commonly available sizes are 1/8", 1/4", 3/8", 1/2", 5/8", 3/4", 4 mm, 6 mm, 8 mm, 10 mm, 12 mm, 14 mm, 16 mm and 18 mm. The drills are most ordinarily available with either 90° or 120° included angle points.
