= Barrel threads =

Method to attach a weapon barrel and receiver

In firearms, barrel threads refer to the screw threads used to attach a barrel.

Action threads, also called receiver threads, are situated at the chamber end of the barrel, and can be used for attaching the barrel to the receiver. The receiver normally has corresponding threads which are internal, with the matching action threads on the barrel usually being external threads. This design is most commonly used in rifles and revolvers, but also on some pistols and shotguns. This method of fixing a barrel to a receiver has been used extensively by firearms manufacturers since before the 20th century, and can be viewed as a traditional barrel mounting method. Action threads are not the only method of fixing a barrel to a receiver (see Alternative methods below). Furthermore, recoil-operated firearm designs have moving barrels (e.g. most pistols or the Barrett M82 rifle).

Muzzle threads are situated at the muzzle end of the barrel and can be used for mounting accessories such as a flash hider, suppressor or muzzle brake (compensator).

== Designation ==
There are many systems for designating thread types (metric, unified, Whitworth, etc.). Threading can be specified by diameter, pitch, angle, length and fit tolerances. However, the use of action threads is not well standardized within the firearms industry, and threading can vary between manufacturers and models.

For example, factory and aftermarket receivers using the Remington 700 footprint are produced with various types of action threads, all with a 26.99 mm (1 1/16 in) diameter, but with a pitch of either a 1.588 mm (16 TPI, Remington standard), 1.411 mm (18 TPI) or 1.270 mm (20 TPI, Savage standard).

Typically, many rifles use thread diameters in the range between 25–27 mm (0.98–1.06 in). Many older rifles from the first half of the 20th century use a thread pitch around 2 mm (12.7 TPI), while many modern rifle use thread pitches around 1.5 mm (16.93 TPI). Fine threaded systems intended for hand tightening typically use thread pitches around 1 mm (25.4 TPI).

== Mounting ==
Using action threads to mount a barrel to a receiver typically requires fitting by a competent gunsmith, and typically some machining has to be done.

In this process it is important to set the correct headspace. Correct mounting is important both for safety and accuracy. If the barrel, receiver and bolt are not fitted properly, severe and potential fatal problems can arise due to faulty headspace, e.g. cartridge overpressure and case rupture. Threaded barrels are often mounted to the receiver with a lot of torque, and will therefore generally require tools for assembly and disassembly, such as a suitable action wrench and a vise. Depending on the firearm, a recoil lug is sometimes fitted between the barrel and stock as part of the process,

Cleaning up the receiver and barrel action threads is often done during "blueprinting" in order to increase accuracy.

== Action threads ==
=== List of action threads ===
- M designates common V threads (like for instance metric threads)
- Sq designates square threads
- Tr designates trapezoidal threads
- The shank length is not always the same at the thread length, which is the case if the insert has a threadless portion (sub-shank)
- Tenon designates the thread length
- Shoulder designates the barrel diameter in front of the thread portion
- Unless otherwise mentioned, right hand threads are assumed. Left hand threads are designated "LH".

Model	Diameter (mm)	Pitch (mm)	Thread angle	Shank length	Comment	Inch
Smith & Wesson J Frame	M12.70	0.706 mm	60°		Also written as 0.500"-36	1/2"-36
Smith & Wesson K Frame	M13.72	0.706 mm	60°		Also written as 0.540"-36	69/128"-36
Smith & Wesson L Frame, Colt J, V, Colt AA Mark III / King Cobra, Colt Python (new), Colt Trooper (J, V, AA)	M14.27	0.706 mm	60°		Also written as 0.562"-36	9/16"-36
Colt Python (old), Colt E & I	M14.31	0.794 mm	60°		Also written as 0.5634"-32	9/16"-32
Destroyer 1921 carbine (Spanish)	M15.88	0.977 mm	60°	15.88 mm	21.59 mm diameter at the shoulder	5/8"-26
Ruger GP-100	M15.88	1.058 mm	60°			5/8"-24
Remington Rolling Block No. 4 Rem. Action (solid frame model)	M16.64	1.588 mm	90°	16.89 mm	Also written as 0.655"-16.	21/32"-16
Mathieu	Tr16.76	2.54 mm	29°	16.76 mm	Trapezoidal threads. Also written as 0.660"-20	85/128"-20
Ruger Blackhawk	M16.97	1.058 mm	60°		Also written as 0.668"-24	43/64"-24
Smith & Wesson N Frame	M17.02	0.706 mm	60°		Also written as 0.670"-36	43/64"-36
Remington Rolling Block No. 4 Rem. Action (takedown model)	⌀17.15	(no threads)	N/A	17.02 mm*	Also written as 0.675". *Of which a length of 5.56 mm of the shank has its diameter reduced to 15.62 mm.	27/40"
Ruger Single Six series	M17.26	1.058 mm	60°			87/128"-24
Colt Single Action Army Revolver (third gen)	M17.35	1.058 mm	60°	17.75 mm	Also written as 0.683"-24. Only 14.43 mm of the shank is threaded.	87/128"-24
Colt Single Action Army Revolver (first and second gen)	M17.65	1.270 mm	60°	17.75 mm	Also written as 0.695"-20. Only 14.73 mm of the shank is threaded.	89/128"-20
M1917 revolver	M17.65	1.270 mm	60°		Also written as 0.695"-20	89/128"-20
Ruger Redhawk	M19.05	1.270 mm	60°			3/4"-20
Falling Block Works (FBW) Model K	M19.05	1.588 mm	60°	25.15 mm		3/4"-16
Stiller SPF 2500X	M19.05	1.588 mm	60°			3/4"-16
BSA Martini Cadet	M19.05	1.814 mm	55°	16.74 mm	Maximum 25.40 mm shoulder	3/4"-14
Marlin 336, 1895 (.45-70)	Sq19.69	2.117 mm	90°	21.59 mm	Square threads	0.775"-12
Marlin 1895 (.450)	M19.69	2.117 mm	60°	21.59 mm		0.775"-12
Ruger Mini-14	M20.64	1.270 mm	60°			13/16"-20
Colt AR-15	M20.64	1.588 mm	60°		The barrel nut thread is M31.75 × 1.411 mm (1-1/4"-18)	13/16"-16
HK416, HK MR223, HK MR556	M21	1.5 mm	60°		The barrel nut thread is M32 × 1.5 mm (1.26"-16.93)	0.827"-16.93
Remington Rolling Block No. 2 Rem. Action	Sq21.59	2.117 mm	90°	30.48 mm*	Square threads. Also written as 0.850"-12. *Of which a length of 10.16 mm of the shank has its diameter reduced to 20.45 mm	17/20"-12
Remington Rolling Block No. 1-1/2 Rem., Sporting Action	Sq21.59	2.117 mm	90°	36.65 mm*	Square threads. Also written as 0.850"-12. *Of which a length of 12.70 mm of the shank has its diameter reduced to 20.32 mm	17/20"-12
Remington 1867 Navy pistol	Sq21.59	2.117 mm	90°		Square threads. Also written as 0.850"-12.	17/20"-12
Kimber M/84	M21.43	1.27 mm	60°			27/32"-20
Sako L46/L-46	M21.72	1.588 mm	60°	21.46 mm	Also written as 0.855"-16.	55/64"-16
Howa 1500 Mini Action	M22	1.0 mm	60°			
Zastava M85 «Mini Mauser»	M22	1.5 mm	60°			0.866"-16.93
Sako L461	M22	1.6 mm	60°	19.40 mm		0.864"-15.87
Mossberg MVP .223	M22.23	0.907 mm	60°		Also written as 0.875"-28.	7/8"-28
Weatherby Mark V Varmint, Weatherby Mark V Varmintmaster	M22.23	1.411 mm	60°	16.99 mm		7/8"-18
Cooper Model 22	M22.23	1.588 mm	60°	16.26 mm		7/8"-16
Savage Model 1920	Sq22.86	2.117 mm	90°		Square threads. Also written as 0.900"-12.	29/32"-12
Browning BPCR, 1885	M23.75	1.270 mm	60°	23.37 mm	Also written as 0.935"-20.	15/16"-20
Winchester 1885	M23.75	1.588 mm	60°	23.37 mm		15/16"-16
Browning A-Bolt (early), Browning BBR, Remington 7600	M23.81	1.270 mm	60°			15/16"-20
TAP-174, TAP-375	M24	1.0 mm	60°	19.75±0.05 mm	27.50 mm shoulder	0.945"-25.4
Sako AI/A1 (PPC, Vixen)	M24	1.5 mm	60°			0.945"-16.93
Jalonen JJ-91	M24	1.5 mm	60°			0.945"-16.93
Keppeler	M24	1.5 mm	60°	18 mm		0.945"-16.93
Loppo 1, Loppo 2	M24	1.5 mm	60°	20 mm		0.945"-16.93
Remington Rolling Block No. 1 Rem., Blackpowder Action	Sq24.77	2.117 mm	90°	36.02 mm*	Square threads. Also written as 0.975"-12. *Of which a length of 10.62 mm of the shank has its diameter reduced to 23.37 mm	39/40"-12
Mosin-Nagant M91/30	M24.64, M24.77 M24.89	1.588 mm, 1.588 mm, 1.814 mm	55/60°	23.88 mm	30.02 mm shoulder. Thread angle varies.	0.970"-16, 0.975"-16, 0.980"-14
MAS M-1936	M24.89	1.588 mm	60°	21.46 mm	Also written as 0.980"-16.	63/64"-16
Husqvarna 1640,	M24.89	2.117 mm	55°	18.16 mm	27.94 mm shoulder. Also written as 0.979"-12.	63/64"-12
Mauser small ring: Mauser G33/40, Model 93, 94, 95; Swedish m/1896 and m/1938	M25	2.117 mm	55°	18.16 mm / 16.38 mm / 15.88 mm / 16.2+0.2 mm	24.89 mm major diameter. 27.94 mm shoulder	0.980"-12, 0.993"-12
Krag–Jørgensen, American model (US Krag-Jørgensen)	Tr24.89	2.54 mm	29°	19.23 mm	Also written as 0.979"-10. Trapezoidal threads, 24.89 mm shoulder	63/64"-10
CZ 527, BRNO FOX	M25	1.25 mm	60°		Also written as 0.984"-20.32.	1.024"-20.32
Krico 500, 700, M600, M700	M25	1.25 mm	60°	19.85-0.1 mm	28.00-0.05 mm shoulder	0.984"-20.32
Krico M-600, Tradewind 600	M25	1.270 mm	60°	20.32 mm	30.35 mm shoulder	0.985"-20
Lebel Berthier 8 mm	M25	1.411 mm	55°/60°	25.53 mm	29.21 mm shoulder	0.985"-18
Varberger 717, 757, 777, Kongsberg Lakelander 389, Kongsberg 393	M25	1.5 mm	60°	19.75±0.05 mm	27.50 mm shoulder	0.984"-16.93
Heym SR 21, SR 30	M25	1.5 mm	60°	29.98 mm	29.25 mm shoulder, 5.90 mm loose recoil lug	0.984"-16.93
Nikko Model 7000, Golden Eagle Model 7000	M25	1.5 mm	60°			1"-16.03
FR F1	M25	1.5 mm	60°	22 mm		
Sako L57 / L-57	M25	1.5 mm, 1.588 mm	60°	21.46 mm		0.984"-16.93, 0.984"-16
Sako L-579, L579 Forester, L61 (early)	M25	1.588 mm	60°	22.10 mm		1"-16
Mauser 8 mm (Siamese)	M25	1.814 mm	55°	13.08 mm	27.94 mm shoulder	0.990"-14
Husqvarna 1600, 1900, 2000, 8000, Carl Gustaf 1900, Carl Gustaf 2000	M25	2.117 mm	55°	19.56 mm	27.94 mm shoulder	0.984"-12
Mauser 89 (Belgian)	M25	2.117 mm	55°	19.3 mm	28.32 mm shoulder	0.985"-12
Mauser 88 (German)	M25	2.117 mm	55°	18.29 mm		0.986"-12
Mauser Brevex Magnum	M25	2.117 mm	55°	19.56 mm		0.988"-12
Mauser 91 (Argentine)	M25	2.117 mm	55°	21.46 mm	33.66 mm shoulder	0.986"-12
Mauser 71/84	M25	2.117 mm	55°	21.59 mm	26.10 mm shoulder	0.987"-12
Farquharson rifle (Gibbs, Jeffery, and others)	M25.07	1.814 mm	55°/60°	22.23 mm	Also written as 0.987"-14. Thread angle varies with production year and manufacturer	1"-14
Husqvarna RB shotgun, RB M67	M25.10	2.117 mm	55°/60°	16 mm		0.988"-12
Kongsberg M60 jakt, M83, M83S, M83SK	M25.23	2.117 mm	55°	16.2+0.2 mm	Also written as 0.993"-12. Major diameter 25.23-0.2 mm.	1"-12
Krag–Jørgensen, Norwegian model	Tr25.30 LH, Sq26.67 LH	2.117 mm	90°/29°	19.5+0.3 mm	29+0.1 mm shoulder. Left hand threads. *Trapezoidal threads on Steyr manufactured actions, also written as 0.996"-12 LH. *Square threads on Kongsberg manufactured actions, also written as 25.3-0.1 mm.	1"-12 LH, 1-1/16"-12 LH
Browning A-Bolt (late)	M25.40	0.794 mm	60°			1"-32
Mossberg MVP .308, Mossberg 100ATR, Mossberg ATR Night Train, Mossberg 4x4	M25.40	1.270 mm	60°			1"-20
Remington 788	M25.40	1.270 mm	60°	38.1 mm / 39.6 mm		1"-20
Ruger No. 1, M77, M77 MkII	M25.40	1.588 mm	60°	17.53 mm	35.56 mm shoulder	1"-16
Colt Light Rifle	M25.40	1.588 mm	60°			1-16
FN FAL	M25.40	1.588 mm	60°			1"-16
Ruger American	M25.40	1.588 mm	60°	26.8 mm		1"-16
Ruger American Magnum	M25.40	1.588 mm	60°	30.5 mm		1"-16
Ruger Precision Rifle (RPR)	M25.40	1.588 mm	60°		Timing via barrel nut M31.75x1.411 mm (1-1/4"-18 TPI).	1"-16
Winchester Model 70 (post 64)	M25.40	1.588 mm	60°	17.78 mm		1"-16
Winchester 54/70 (pre 64)	M25.40	1.588 mm	60°	18.8 mm	29.08 mm shoulder	1"-16
Winchester 54/70 (.22 Hornet)	M25.40	1.588 mm	60°	21.21 mm	28.96 mm shoulder	1"-16
Tikka M55, M595, M695	M25.40	1.588 mm	60°			1"-16
Tikka T3, T3X	M25.40	1.588 mm	60°	22.10 mm		1"-16
Sako L-61 (1. Mod.), Sako L61R Finnbear (early)	M25.40	1.588 mm	60°			1"-16
Sako 75	M25.40	1.588 mm	60°			1"-16
Sako 85	M25.40	1.588 mm	60°			1"-16
SIG Sauer CROSS			60°			1"-16
Lee-Enfield (SMLE)	M25.40	1.814 mm	55°/60°	17.46 mm	25.32 mm major diameter. Most have a 60 grader thread angle, but some have 55°. A length of 2.54 mm of the shank at the chamber side in unthreaded with a diameter of 22.86 mm diameter.	1"-14
Homer Koon Omega III	M25.40	1.814 mm	60°			1"-14
Champlin (1968, 1971)	M25.40	1.814 mm	60°	15.24 mm		1"-14
Martini-Henry, Martini-Enfield, Metford	M25.40	1.814 mm	55°/60°	17.78 mm	Thread angle depends on production date	1"-14
Falling Block Works (FBW) Model S	M25.40	1.814 mm	60°	37.97 mm		1"-14
Falling Block Works (FBW) Model H, J	M25.40	1.814 mm	60°	25.15 mm		1"-14
Ranger Arms Texas Magnum	M25.40	1.814 mm	60°	25.15 mm	29.21 mm shoulder	1"-14
Navy Arms Pedersoli Remington Rolling block	M25.40	1.814 mm	60°	38.86 mm*	30.5 mm shoulder. *The final part of the shank has its diameter reduced to 22.86 mm.	1"-14
M1 Garand, M14, M1A	Tr25.40	2.540 mm	29°		ACME trapezoidal threads. 24.66 mm-0.13 mm major diameter, 23.19 mm- 0.13 mm minor diameter, 1.32 mm-0.08 mm average thread width. Internal radius of 0.25 mm, external radius of 0.13 mm.	1"-10 (0.968"-10)
Sauer 202 Magnum	⌀__mm	N/A	N/A		Clamp coupling	
DPMS G2, Remington R10			60°		The barrel nut threads are M33.34 × 1.411 mm (1-5/16"-18)	
Armalite AR-10, Eagle Arms AR-10, Noveske Rifleworks N6	M25.40	1.588 mm	60°		The barrel nut threads are M36.51 × 1.411 mm (1-7/16-18, tolerance class 3A).	1"-16
DPMS LR-308; S&W M&P 10, Bushmaster ORC, Remington R25, POF P-308*, (and most other AR308 / 308AR)	M25.40	1.588 mm	60°		The barrel nut threads are M36.51 × 1.588 mm (1-7/16"-16, tolerance class 2A). *Tolerance class 2B	1"-16
Ithaca / Tikka LSA-55	M25.91	1.588 mm	60°			1.020"-16
HK417, MR308, MR762		1.5 mm	60°		Barrel nut	?-16.93
Sauer 80, 90, 92, Carl Gustaf 3000, Colt Sauer	M26	1.5 mm	60°			1.024"-16.93
Howa 1500, S&W 1500, Mossberg 1500, Weatherby Vanguard	M26	1.5 mm	60°	17.91 mm	3.8 mm depth countersink for the bolt head with a 17.9 mm diameter	1.023"-16.93
Arisaka T99	M26	1.5 mm	60°	17.78 mm	31.93 mm shoulder	1.024"-16.93
Remington 799	M26	1.5 mm	60°			1.020"-16.93
Arisaka T38, T44	M26	1.75 mm	60°	18.29 mm	28.58 mm shoulder	1.024"-14.51
Schultz & Larsen Model S4J, Model 68DL	M26	1.8 mm	60°			1.024"-14.11
Steyr-Mannlicher M1895	M26	1.814 mm	60°	17.60 mm		1.023"-14
Springfield M1903 A3/ A4	Sq26.42	2.540 mm	29°	18.64 mm	Square threads, 29.08 mm shoulder, 26.42 mm major diameter, 25.15 mm minor diameter, 1.30 mm + 0.05 mm average thread width. Also written as 1.040"-10.	1-3/64"-10
The Newton Rifle, Buffalo Newton 1924	Sq26.42	2.540 mm	90°		Square threads	1.040"-10
Sako L61/L-61 (late), Sako L61R Finnbear (late)	M26.59	1.588 mm	60°	22.10 mm	Also written as 1.046"-16	1-3/64"-16
Remington 700, 721, 722, 725, XP-100, Defiant	M26.67	1.588 mm	60°	22.48 mm	30.35 mm shoulder. Also written as 1.050"-16.	1-1/16-16
Remington Rolling Block No. 1 M/1902, 7 mm Action	Sq26.80	2.117 mm	90°	36.32 mm*	Square threads. Also written as 1.055"-12. *Of which a length of 10.92 mm of the shank has its diameter reduced to 25.40 mm	1-7/128"-12
Remington 783	M26.80	0.907 mm	60°		Also written as 1.055"-28	1-1/16"-28
Savage Small shank (M110, M-110, M110 C, 112)	M26.80	1.270 mm	60°	42.06 mm	Also written as 1.055"-20	1-1/16"-20
Nucleus, Mausingfield	M26.80	1.270 mm	60°		Also written as 1.055"-20	1-1/16"-20
BAT TR (serienr. over 100)	M26.92	1.411 mm	60°	23.37 mm		1-1/16"-18
BAT Bumblebee, Vampire, Igniter	M26.92	1.411 mm	60°	19.61 mm		1-1/16"-18
Krag–Jørgensen, Danish model	M26.92	2.117 mm	55°/60°	27.43 mm	Conical threads	1-1/16"-12
Mannlicher–Schönauer (Greek)	M26.92	2.117 mm	60°	18.47 mm	Also written as 1.059"-12.	1-1/16"-12
Kongsberg M48 rescue gun	M26.92	2.117 mm	55°	18.03 mm	Also written as 1.059"-12. 29.85 mm shoulder diameter.	1-1/16"-12
Mauser FÉG 35M, G98/40	M26.92	2.117 mm	55°	18.03 mm	29.85 mm shoulder	1-1/16"-18
Defiance Deviant	M26.97	1.588 mm	60°	24.26 mm	3.8 mm depth countersink for the bolt head with a 17.9 mm diameter	1-1/16"-16
HS Precision 2000 Short Action	M26.97	1.588 mm	60°			1-1/16"-16
Surgeon 591 Short Action	M26.97	1.588 mm	60°	24.13 mm	3.8 mm depth countersink for the bolt head with a 17.9 mm diameter	1-1/16"-16
Thompson/Center Icon	M26.97	1.588 mm	60°			1-1/16"-16
Ultimatum Deadline Short Action	M26.99	1.270 mm	60°			1-1/16"-20
Kelbly Atlas	M26.99	1.411 mm	60°	17.58 mm	Also written as 1.061"-18	1-1/16"-18
Kelbly Long Atlas	M26.99	1.411 mm	60°	14.15 mm		1-1/16"-18
BAT S, SV, B, DS, 3L, 3LL	M26.99	1.411 mm	60°	26.7 mm		1-1/16"-18
BAT SB, MB	M26.99	1.411 mm	60°	26.7 mm	The shoulder must have a radius	1-1/16"-18
Kelbly Atlas Short Action, Atlas Long Action	M26.99	1.411 mm	60°	14.15 mm		1-1/16"-18
BAT VR, BTA, TR (TR with serial number below 100)	M26.99	1.411 mm	60°	17.68 mm / 19.61 mm		1-1/16"-18
Stolle Panda Short Action	M26.99	1.411 mm	60°	28.32 mm	30 degree countersink for the bolt head	1-1/16"-18
Stolle Panda Long Action	M26.99	1.411 mm	60°	24.89 mm	Straight bolt head	1-1/16"-18
Curtis Vector	M26.99	1.588 mm	60°			1-1/16"-16
Weatherby Mark V, Mark V Magnum	M26.99	1.588 mm	60°	17.53 mm		1-1/16"-16
Weatherby Mark V Magnum	M26.99	1.588 mm	60°	17.78 mm	29.21 mm shoulder	1-1/16"-16
Stiller Predator	M26.99	1.588 mm	60°	25.15 mm	3.8 mm depth countersink for the bolt head with a 17.9 mm diameter	1-1/16"-16
Sauer 200, 202, SIG Sauer 200 STR, 205, 3000, Carl Gustaf CG 4000	⌀27 mm	N/A	N/A	36.5 mm	Clamp coupling. The clamping section is 36.5 mm long. The clamping portion of the 202 is somewhat shorter, such that 200 STR barrels can be used in the 202 without modifications (but not necessarily the other way around).	1.063"
Sauer 303	⌀__mm	N/A	N/A		Clamp coupling.	
Sauer 404	⌀__mm	N/A	N/A		Clamp coupling.	
Jalonen JJ-92A	M27	1.5 mm	60°			1.062"-16.93
Sardec	M27	1.5 mm	60°	25 mm		1.062"-16.93
Sako TRG22, TRG-S, M995, Sako S20	M27	1.5 mm	60°			1.062"-16.93
Carcano M91	M27	1.75 mm	60°	27.05 mm	28.83 mm shoulder. Also written as 0.968"-14.	1.062"-14.51
Accuracy International Short action AI (AT, AX308, AE, AW)	M27	2.0 mm	60°		Indexed via a set screw	1.063"-12.7
Steyr-Mannlicher M1895	M27, M26.99	2 mm, 2.117 mm	60°	24.38 mm		1.063-12.7, 1-1/16"-12
Kongsberg M52 (jakt, redningsgevær), M55 jakt, M58 skarpskytter, M59 skarpskytter, M62 jakt, M63 selfangstgevær, M64 treningsgevær, M67 skarpskytter, M80 skarpskytter, M85E	M28	2.117 mm	55°	16.2+0.2 mm	27.9 mm major diameter. Also written as 1.098"-12.	1.098"-12
Husqvarna 640	M28	2.117 mm	55°	16.2+0.2 mm		1.098"-12
Norinco Model 1887	M28	0.977 mm	60°		Clone of Winchester Model 1887	1.100"-26
Savage Bolt Action Shotgun	M28	1.270 mm	60°			1.100"-20
Heym SR 10, SR 20, Mauser 2000, 3000	M28	2.117 mm	60°			1.100"-12
CZ BBK-02	M28	2.117 mm	60°			1.100"-12
Fabrique Nationale 222 Benchrest	M28	2.117 mm	55°/60°	15.9 mm	Built on Mauser 98 actions	1.100"-12
Zastava M70 / M98	M28	2.117 mm	55°			1.100"-12
Voere Shikar, K-14	M28	2.117 mm	60°			1.100"-12
Mauser large ring: Mauser K98k, M98, Mauser Model 24 (Yugoslavian); Interarms Mark X	M28	2.117 mm	55° / 60°	16.2+0.2 mm / 15.88 mm	Major diameter 27.90-0.10 mm	1.100"-12
CZ 550, 557, 602	M28	2.0 mm	60°			1.102"-12.7
Kongsberg Rolling Block (RB) M/1867	M28		55°			
Kongsberg RB shotgun	Tr		29°		Trapezoidal threads	
Jarmann M/1884			55°/60°			
Savage Large Shank	M28.58	1.270 mm	60°		Also written as 1.120"-20	1-1/8"-20
Savage 110 (short magnum), Ultimatum Deadline Long Action	M28.58	1.270 mm	60°			1-1/8"-20
Tubb 2000, Tubb ATR	M28.58	1.411 mm	60°		Barrel coupler is 1-3/4"-18	1-1/8"-18
Armalite AR-30	M28.58	1.411 mm	60°		UNEF, tolerance class 3A	1-1/8"-18
BAT M	M28.58	1.588 mm	60°	26.67 mm		1-1/8"-16
BAT HR, BTLA	M28.58	1.588 mm	60°	17.30 mm / 19.25 mm		1-1/8"-16
Herters (BSA) U-9	M28.32	2.117 mm	55°	23.37 mm	31.37 mm shoulder. Also written as 1.115"-12.	1-1/8"-12
Falling Block Works (FBW) Model L Express	M28.58	2.117 mm	60°	25.15 mm		1-1/8"-12
Enfield P-14	Tr28.58	2.54 mm	29°	18.29 mm	Trapezoidal threads, 33.66 mm shoulder	1-1/8"-10
Enfield 1917	Tr28.58	2.54 mm	29°	20.32 mm	Trapezoidal threads, 33.66 mm shoulder	1-1/8"-10
Enfield P-14, M1917	Sq28.58	2.54 mm	90°		Square threads	1-1/8"-10
Remington 30, 30S, 720	M28.58	2.54 mm	60°	18.29 mm	33.66 mm shoulder	1-1/8"-10
Accuracy International Long action magnum AI (AXMC, AX338)	M30	2.0 mm	60°		Indexing via set screw	1.181"-12.7
BAT CT	M30.16	1.588 mm	60°	26.42 mm		1-3/16"-16
BAT L	M31.75	1.588 mm	60°	44.2 mm		1-1/4"-16
BAT EX with CHEY-TAC breechface	M38.10	1.588 mm	60°	37.34 mm		1-1/2"-16
BAT EX with 50 BMG breechface	M38.10	1.588 mm	60°	34.80 mm		1-1/2"-16

=== Alternative methods ===
Several alternative mounting methods to using action threads exist.

Barrel press fit
Pressing the barrel into the receiver to achieve a press fit is an alternative to using action threads which has been used on firearms such as Anschütz Fortner, Anschütz Model 54, AKM and Sauer 101.

Barrel nut
Attaching the barrel to the receiver using a barrel nut and a barrel with a shoulder is an alternative to action threads, which has been used in firearms such as the Sten gun and AR-15.

Hand tools
Quick barrel change systems is an increasingly popular alternative, as seen in for example SIG Sauer 200 STR, Roessler Titan or Blaser R8. These methods typically only require simple hand tools (like a hex key) or no tools at all. This can be a great advantage to competition shooters who regularly wear out barrels, or for hunters who want a modular rifle that can shoot several calibers. In these designs, the bolt locks directly into the barrel, and the manufacturer often guarantees that the barrel is headspaced correctly from the factory.

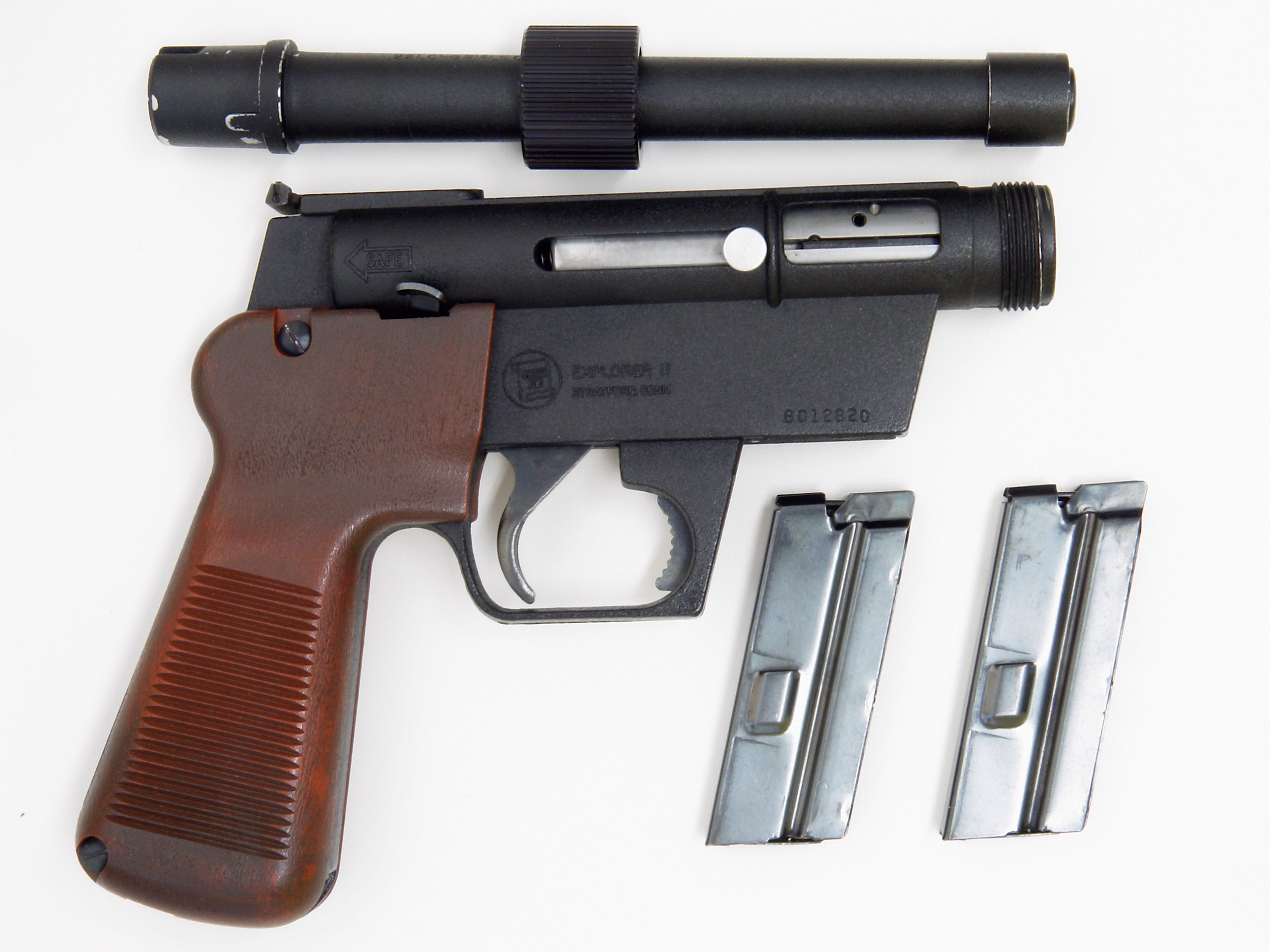
A quick change barrel system using threads, intended to be assembled and disassembled without tools.

== Muzzle threads ==
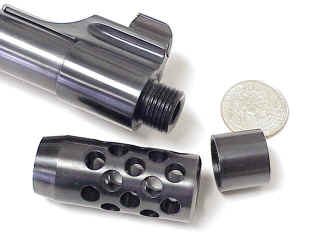
Gun with threaded muzzle beside a disassembled muzzle brake and thread protector.

Muzzle threads is one method of fitting accessories such as flash hiders, suppressors or muzzle brakes (compensators). The applicable thread is limited to a certain degree by the bullet caliber and barrel diameter. Right-hand threads (RH) are most common, but left-hand threads (LH) are sometimes used instead. Unless otherwise stated, right-hand threads are usually assumed.

In Europe it has become common to use 1 mm muzzle thread pitches. M14x1 is a common thread type on European hunting barrels, while M18x1 is common on competition bull barrels. A larger barrel thread diameter can improve the precision of the barrel. As of 2021, various Unified threads are still the de facto standard on most American firearms, such as 1/2"-28 (M12.7x0.907) on 5.6 mm (.223") caliber rifles and 5/8"-24 (M15.88x1.058) on 7.62 mm (.308") calibers.

Some common barrel threads are listed below:

Common muzzle threads
Diameter	Pitch	Comment	Inch
M12.7	0.907 mm	Common on American rifles and pistols chambered for .223 Rem, .22 LR and 9×19mm.	1/2"-28
M12.7	1.270 mm	Common on older European rifles chambered for .22 LR.	1/2"-20
M13.5	1 mm LH	Some European 9×19mm pistols	69/128"-25.4 LH
M14	1 mm	Very common on European hunting rifles. Also used on some airsoft guns (although often in the left-hand version).	71/128"-25.4
M15.88	1.058 mm	Very common on American rifles chambered for the 7.62 caliber (for example .300 BLK, 7.62x39 mm, .308 Win)	5/8"-24
M18	1 mm	Common on European rifles with bull barrels.	45/64"-25.4

Less common muzzle threads
Diameter	Pitch	Comment	Inch
M8	0.75 mm	Some .22 LR pistols	20/64"-33.87
M9.53	1.058 mm	Some .22 LR pistols	3/8-24
M12.7	0.706 mm	Some 9 mm rifles	1/2"-36
M13	1 mm	Older Glock 9×19mm, Galil (5.56 and 7.62 mm)	33/64"-25.4
M13	1 mm LH	Steyr AUG	33/64"-25.4 LH
M14	1 mm LH	AK-47 and AKM. Also common on airsoft guns.	71/128"-25.4 LH
M14.29	1.058 mm	Some .40"/10 mm pistols. Used on some rifles in .223", 6.5 mm, .308", and 9×19mm.	9/16-24
M14.29	1.058 mm LH	FN FAL	9/16-24 LH
M14.68	0.907 mm	Some pistols in .45-kaliber. Also written as .578"-28.	74/128"-28
M15	1 mm	Some German rifles.	38/64"-25.4
M16	1 mm	.45 caliber pistols from HK.	20/32"-25.4
M16	1 mm LH	.45 caliber pistols from HK.	20/32"-25.4 LH
M17.46	1.058 mm	Some American 7.62 mm bull barrels, as well as some barrels for .450 Bushmaster (11 mm caliber).	11/16-24
M18	1.5 mm	Accuracy International .338 LM.	45/64"-16.93
M22	0.75 mm	Saiga 12 gauge shotgun	111/128"-33.87
M22.23	1.814 mm	Some rifles in 12.7 mm caliber	7/8"-14
M24	1 mm	Accuracy International 12.7 mm, Micro Uzi, Uzi pistol	121/128"-25.4
M24	1.5 mm	AK-74 (5.45x39 mm)	121/128"-16.93
M25	1 mm	Desert Tech 12.7	63/64"-25.4
M25.4	1.814 mm	Some rifles in 12.7 mm caliber.	1"-14
M26	1.5 mm	Zastava M85 and M92 (7.62x39 mm), Uzi, Mini Uzi.	1-3/128"-16.93

== External threads on muzzle accessories ==
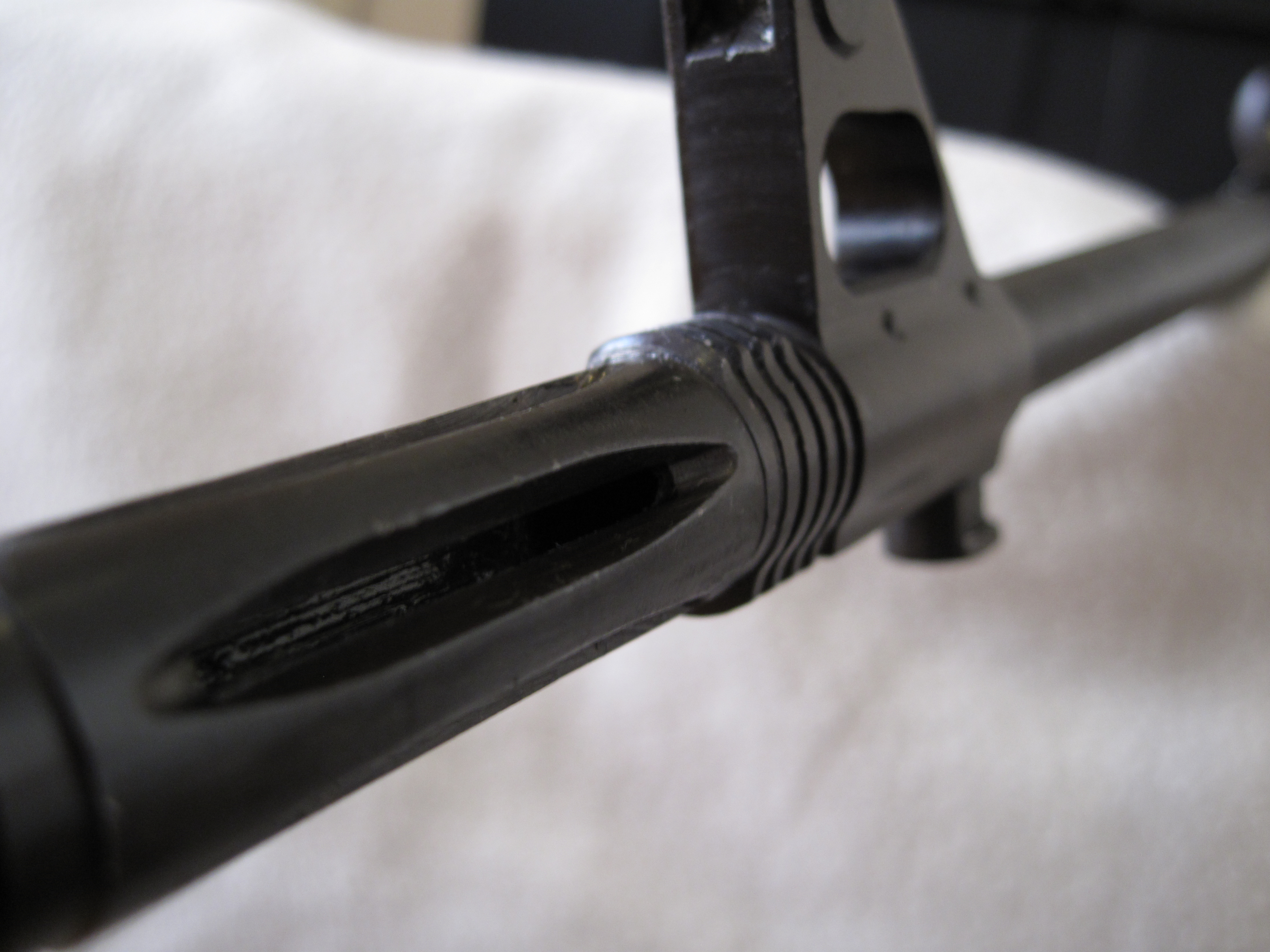
Flash hider with external threads for a suppressor on a Zastava M76.

Some accessories, notably suppressors and concussion reduction devices (CRDs), attach via a muzzle device such as a flash hider, compensator, thread protector or sleeve.

External threads on muzzle accessories
Diameter	Pitch	Comment	Inch
M19	1.588 mm	Oil filters on Ford, Dodge og Jeep	3/4"-16
M20	2.5 mm	Standard metric coarse thread	101/128"-10.16
M20.6	1.588 mm	Flash hiders from Kineti-Tech. Oil filters from Chevy and GM.	13/16"-16
M20.6	1.814 mm	Standard pipe thread (NPT).	3/4"-14
M22.9	1.058 mm	Q Cherry	.900"-24
M24	3 mm	Standard metric coarse thread	121/128"-8.47
M27	1.5 mm	Ase Utra Borelock, Klärig Engineering BL2, Uronen Precision	1-1/16"-25.4
M28.6	2.117 mm	Flash hiders from Cyclone, Angel and Demon, some from SilcencerCo, BattleComp	1-1/8"-12
M30	3.5 mm	Standard metric coarse thread	1-3/16"-7.26
M34.9	0.907 mm	Quietbore Quickie	1-3/8"-28
M34.9	1.058 mm	Some suppressor tubes from SilencerCo, Dead Air, Griffin Armament, ODIN Works, Q LLC, Torrent Suppressors, Area 419, Energetic Armament, YHM, SDTA, Super Precision Concepts, Plan B, Enfield Rifle Company, Rex Silentium, JK Armament, Ronin Factory, JMAC Customs, Enduro, ASR, Aklys Defense.	1-3/8"-24
M36	4 mm	Standard metric coarse thread	1-27/64"-6.35
M36.5	1.270 mm	Suppressor tubes from SDTAC, Diversified Machine, Super Precision Concepts. Maglite D Cell.	1-7/16"-20
M36.5	1.058 mm	Some Diversified Machine suppressors	1-7/16"-24
M38.9	1.058 mm	Some Diversified Machine suppressors	1-17/32"-24
M42	4.5 mm	Standard metric coarse thread	1-21/32"-5.64
M42.5	1.058 mm	Some Diversified Machine suppressors	1-43/64"-24

== See also ==
- Quick-change barrel system
- Press fit barrel
- Interrupted screw
- Trunnion
