= Type 3 81 mm mortar =

Type 3 81 mortar
- Place of origin: Japan

Service history
- Used by: Imperial Japanese Army
- Wars: World War II

Specifications
- Mass: 167 lb (75.7 kg)
- Length: 4 ft 4.6 in (1,336.0 mm)
- Barrel length: 48 in (1,219.2 mm)
- Width: 2 ft 5 in (736.6 mm) (baseplate)
- Caliber: 81 mm
- Action: Manual

The Type 3 81 mm mortar is a smooth bore, muzzle-loading 81 mm (3.19 in) infantry weapon used by the Imperial Japanese Army during World War II. The Type 3 designation was given to this gun as it was accepted in the 3rd year of Emperor Taishō's reign (1914).

== Design ==
Two specimens of the Type 3 81 mm mortar were captured in the Marshall Islands during the Gilbert and Marshall Islands campaign which occurred between late 1943 and early 1944. They are marked "Type 3 81 mm Trench mortar made in 1943, Yokosuka Navy Arsenal". Despite the Type designation, the mortar was believed to be a forerunner of the Type 97 81 mm infantry mortar, the base plate of which can be used with the Type 3.

The general appearance of the Type 3 is identical with that of the Type 97 90 mm Infantry Mortar which was accepted by the Imperial Japanese Army in 1937, (year 2597 on the Japanese calendar). The tube of the Type 3 has the same length as that of the Type 97, but on the former there are two collars machined on the forward portion of the barrel for securing the bipod clamp. The bipod of the Type 3 is constructed of light-weight tubing, and there is no cross-leveling device. Rough cross-leveling adjustment could be made, however, by breaking the bipod support and moving the leg on the low side inward.

The threads of the traversing and elevating mechanisms are of the square type, rather than of the efficient buttress type utilized in the Type 97. No sight has been reported for the Type 3, and the sight for the Type 97 will not fit. The sight mount of the Type 3 is considered unstable. The total weight of the Type 3 is 167 lb (75.75 kg). The tube weighs 47 lb (21.32 kg), the bipod 25 lb (11.34 kg), and the base plate 95 lb (43.09 kg).

== Ammunition ==
The Type 3 8 cm (80 mm) shell recently has been identified for use in the 81 mm mortars. Shaped like the usual types of mortar ammunition, this shell has three features which are new in Japanese mortar shells.

- The cylindrical initial propellant charge is held in position by a base screw, instead of the usual "shotgun shell" type of cartridge. Increments are in circular bags placed around the tail, above the fins.
- The shell has 12 short tail fins, instead of the six long fins found on other Japanese mortar shells.
- A new type of fuze, of the "time and percussion" type, is used with the shells.

The fuse is set for a predetermined time by rotation of a time ring in the lower part of the fuze. On firing, set-back causes the time-train firing pin to function. This initiates the powder in the time-train ring and ignites the safety powder pellet, freeing the impact firing pin. Thus the fuze will function on impact if impact occurs before expiration of the set time. The time-setting can be eliminated altogether by turning the setting ring off the scale. The fuze is not interchangeable with fuzes used in other 8 cm mortar ammunition.

Ammunition for the Type 3 mortar is issued disassembled, but with all components packed in the same box. To prepare a round for firing, the shipping plug is pulled from the booster cavity, and the fuze locked in place by screwing in the set screw located in the nose of the projectile. An ignition cartridge then is pushed firmly into place in the base, and the desired number of small powder bags called "increments" are placed between the fins. The fuze is covered with metal foil and has a projecting wire loop which operates as a tear-wire to aid in removing the foil.

Misfires may occur with some frequency as a result of the base of the ignition cartridge remaining in the tube, preventing the next round from seating.

A Type 100 (1940) fuze for 81 mm mortar shells recently has been identified. The fuze has three main parts;

- nose
- body
- booster

It is made of brass with the exception of the striker-detonator assembly. The nose, which screws into the body, is held by a set screw and contains the arming-firing device. A cavity behind the nose is covered with a perforated brass disk to distribute the flash from the detonator. In the bottom of the cavity is a cylindrical brass plug. This plug is pierced in the middle by a diametrical hole, while another hole, corresponding to the radius, enters at right angles.

This second hole is filled with black powder which acts as a delay train. For instantaneous action the plug is turned so that the flash travels directly from the detonator to the booster without passing through the delay train. Turning the plug clockwise 90 degrees makes the flash travel through the delay-train hole prior to reaching the booster.
