= Lakelander =

Lakelander may refer to:

- The Lakelander, a regional community newspaper in Meningie, South Australia
- Lakelander, a features magazine covering Lakeland, Florida, a city in Polk County, Florida, along Interstate 4 east of Tampa.
- Lakelander rifle, various models of bolt-action rifles produced around the 1970s-1990s
