= Buttress thread =

Screw thread profile with an asymmetric square/slanted shape

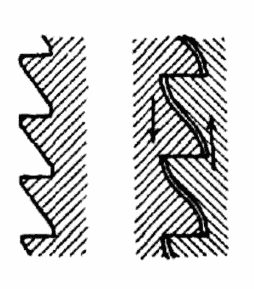
Two types of buttress thread profiles used in machinery.

Buttress thread forms, also known as sawtooth thread forms or breech-lock thread forms. are screw thread profiles with an asymmetric shape, having one square face and the other slanted. They are most commonly used for leadscrews where the load is principally applied in one direction. The asymmetric thread form allows the thread to have low friction and withstand greater loads than other forms in one direction, but at the cost of higher friction and inferior load bearing in the opposite direction. They are typically easier to manufacture than square thread forms but offer higher load capacity than equivalently sized trapezoidal thread forms.

== Buttress thread characteristics ==
The buttress thread form is designed to handle axial thrust applied principally in one direction. The load-bearing thread face is perpendicular or at a slight slant (usually no greater than 7°) to the screw axis. The trailing face is slanted, often at 45°. The resulting thread form has the same low friction properties as a square thread form but at about twice the shear strength due to the long thread base. This thread form is also comparatively easy to machine on a thread milling machine, unlike the difficult-to-machine square thread form. It can also compensate for nut wear using a split nut, much like the trapezoidal Acme thread form.

Buttress threads have often been used in the construction of artillery, particularly with the screw-type breechblock. They are also often used in vises, because great force is only required in one direction.

It is obvious on inspection that a buttress thread with perpendicular face, operating in a split nut, generates minimal disengagement force when tightened in the normally loaded direction, and thus it is possible to derive quick release devices to, for example, allow rapid repositioning of the movable jaw of a vise without having to rotate the screw by many turns. A screw profile, such as acme, where the thrust face is not perpendicular to the axis, generates a significant disengagement force on a split nut, therefore a more robust controlling mechanism would be required. Quick release vices are readily available. It is not known whether any of them are currently using buttress screws. An expired patent for a clamp using a buttress thread exists and one article describes a vise whose screw thread is disengaged by reverse rotation, which is likely to use a buttress thread, however no currently manufactured devices of that nature have been found at this time (October 2018).

=== Types ===
The image gallery below shows some of the types of buttress threads.

Simple buttress thread form

The ANSI 45°/7° buttress thread form

The British 45°/7° buttress thread form

The 45°/5° buttress thread form

The 30°/3° German "Sägengewinde" (saw tooth) buttress thread form

== Buttress thread in oil field tubing ==
In oil field tubing, buttress thread is a pipe thread form designed to provide a tight hydraulic seal. The thread form is similar to that of Acme thread but there are two distinct threaded portions of differing diameters and profiles, the larger having a wedging profile, with a tapered sealing portion in between the larger and smaller diameters. High torque may be transmitted and longitudinal force is transmitted almost parallel to the axis. The thread is about the same strength as standard V threads.

== See also ==
- Leadscrew
- Trapezoidal thread form
