= Trapezoidal thread form =

Screw thread profiles with trapezoidal outlines

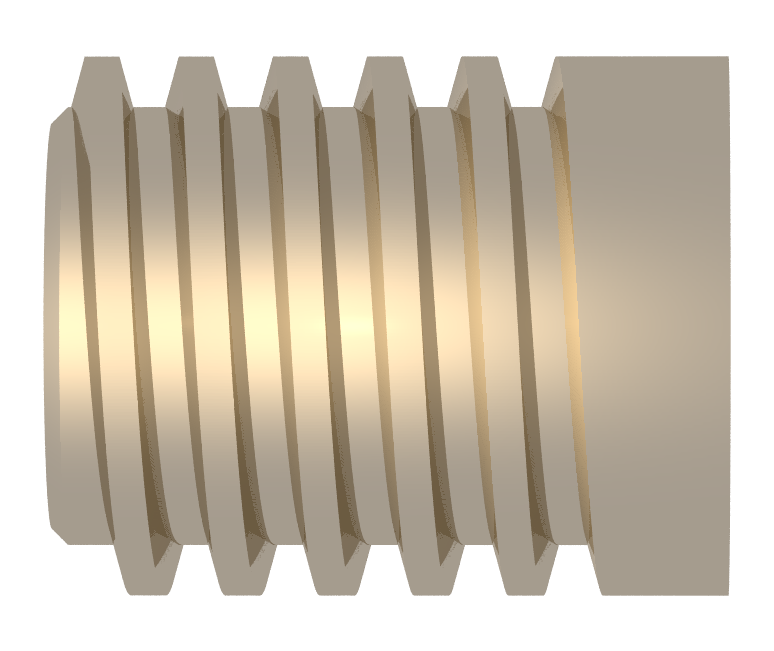
Metric trapezoid thread, TR-40×7.

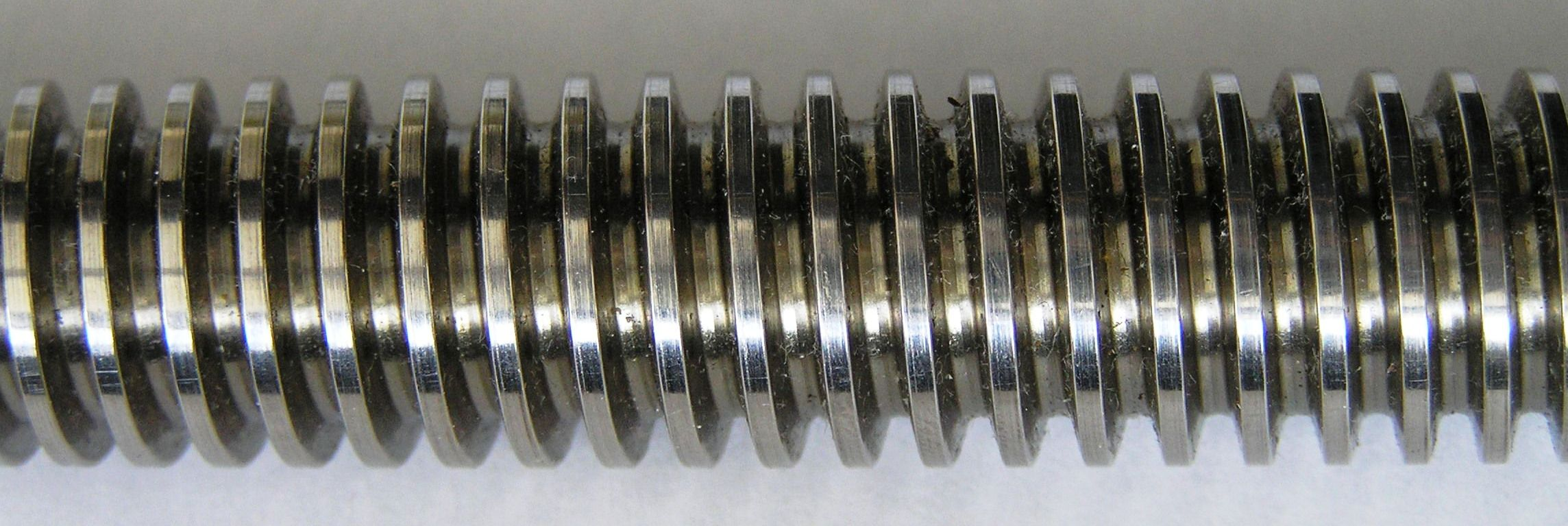
A male Acme thread

Trapezoidal thread forms are screw thread profiles with trapezoidal outlines. They are the most common forms used for leadscrews (power screws). They offer high strength and ease of manufacture. They are typically found where large loads are required, as in a vise or the leadscrew of a lathe. Standardized variations include multiple-start threads, left-hand threads, and self-centering threads (which are less likely to bind under lateral forces).

The original trapezoidal thread form, and still probably the one most commonly encountered worldwide, with a 29° thread angle, is the Acme thread form (/ˈækmiː/ AK-mee). The Acme thread was developed in 1894 as a profile well suited to power screws that has various advantages over the square thread, (Note: The Acme thread was proposed by Albert Man Powell, then president of the Powell Planer Co. of Worcester, Massachusetts.) (Note: The name "Acme thread" was proposed by Albert Ward Handy (1845 October 7 (Bristol, Rhode Island) – 1915 August 27 (Malden, Massachusetts)), who was then a sales representative of the Acme Machinery Co. of Cleveland, Ohio, which made various machine tools.) which had been the form of choice until then. It is easier to cut with either single-point threading or die than the square thread is (because the latter's shape requires tool bit or die tooth geometry that is poorly suited to cutting). It wears better than a square thread (because the wear can be compensated for) and is stronger than a comparably sized square thread. It allows smoother engagement of the half nuts on a lathe leadscrew than a square thread. It is one of the strongest symmetric thread profiles; however, for loads in only one direction, such as vises, the asymmetric buttress thread profile can bear greater loads.

The trapezoidal metric thread form is similar to the Acme thread form, except the thread angle is 30°. It is codified by DIN 103. While metric screw threads are more prevalent worldwide than imperial threads for triangular thread forms, the imperially sized Acme threads predominate in the trapezoidal thread form.

== Acme thread characteristics ==
Basic Acme thread profile

The Acme thread form has a 29° thread angle with a thread height half of the pitch; the apex (or crest) and valley (or root) are flat. This shape is easier to machine (faster cutting, longer tool life) than a square thread. The tooth shape also has a wider base which means it is stronger (thus, the screw can carry a greater load) than a similarly sized square thread. This thread form also allows for the use of a split nut, which can compensate for nut wear.

The line of General Purpose (GP) Acme threads (ASME/ANSI B1.5-1997) are not designed to sustain external radial loads and both the nut and bolt are, ideally, independently supported (the nut by a linear guide and the screw by shaft bearings). This is due to the need to avoid "wedging" of the thread flanks when subjected to radial loads, which would contribute substantially to friction forces and thread wear. However, there is a Centralizing Acme-thread standard (also specified in ASME/ANSI B1.5-1997) which caters to applications where the threads are not radially supported, where the roots and crests of opposing threads are designed to come into contact before the flanks do under radial loads. This adds the requirement that the sum of the allowances (clearances) and tolerances on the major diameters of nut and bolt be less than the sum of the allowances on the pitch diameters (PD). The drawback is that for a given amount of end play (axial clearance due solely to PD clearances), closer tolerances and a cleaner work environment are necessitated in the application of a Centralizing Acme thread.

Compared to square threads, disadvantages of the Acme thread form are lower efficiency due to higher friction and some radial load on the nut (angular offset from square).

When created before 1895, Acme screw threads were intended to replace square threads and a variety of threads of other forms used chiefly for the purpose of traversing on machines, tools, etc. Acme screw threads are now extensively used for a variety of purposes. Long-length Acme threads are used for controlled movements on machine tools, testing machines, jacks, aircraft flaps, and conveyors. Short-length threads are used on valve stems, hose connectors, bonnets on pressure cylinders, steering mechanisms, and camera lens movement.

The thread form shown in the figure (Basic ACME thread profile) is called "basic". The actual thread heights on both the internal (nut) and external (bolt) threads differ from P/2 by allowances (or clearances):

- A minimum root-crest clearance of 0.01 in (0.25 mm) (diametral) between opposing threads with 10 tpi (threads-per-inch) or fewer, and 0.005 in (0.13 mm) for finer pitches. (This is also true for the minor diameters of the Centralizing Acme thread, though not its major diameters, where the allowance is made less than the PD allowance.)
- A PD allowance, which makes the PD smaller than "basic" in the case of the GP and external Centralizing Acme threads, but greater in the case of the internal Centralizing Acme thread.

The net effect is that the minimum thread heights are greater than "basic" for internal and external GP threads and for external Centralizing threads, and the maximum height for internal Centralizing Acme threads is shorter than "basic". The maximum diameter (within tolerance) at the crest of the external threads (called the max. major diameter of external thread) is that of the basic thread form and equals the "nominal diameter", D, stated in the screw's designation. The minimum diameter (within tolerance) at the crest of the internal thread (called the min. minor diameter of internal thread) is that of the basic thread form and equals the nominal diameter minus twice the basic thread height (i.e. D − P).

There is also a "Stub Acme" thread standard, identical in all respects to the one just described except for the height of the basic thread being 0.3P.

Standard Acme thread pitches for diameters in Imperial and US customary units
Nominal diameter (in)	Thread pitch (in)	Thread density (in^{−1})
1/4	1/16	16
5/16	1/14	14
3/8	1/12	12
1/2	1/10	10
5/8	1/8	8
3/4, 7/8	1/6	6
1, 1 1/4	1/5	5
1 1/2, 1 3/4, 2	1/4	4
2 1/2	1/3	3
3	1/2	2

== Metric trapezoidal thread characteristics ==
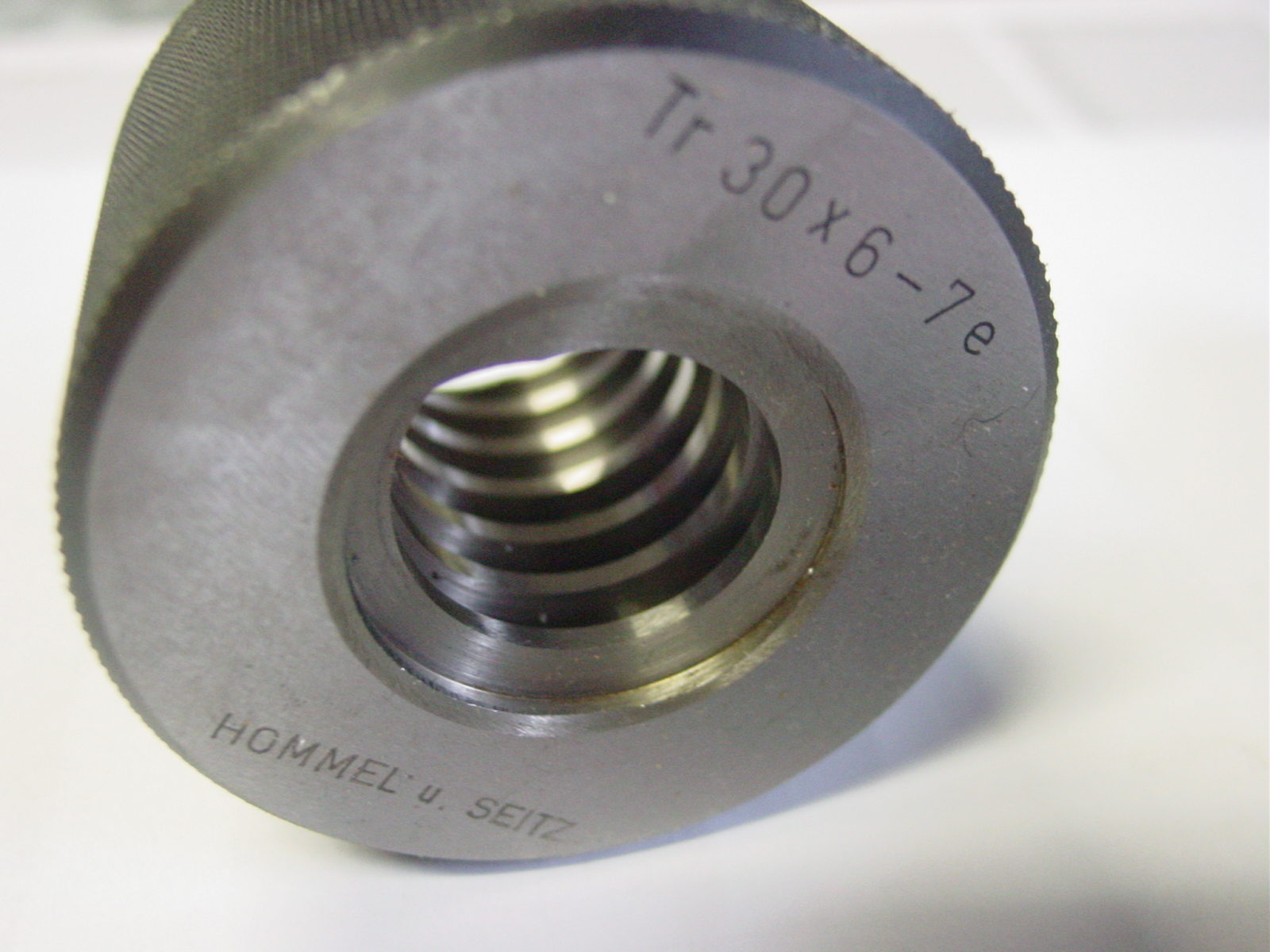
A thread pitch gauge with metric Tr 30 threads (30 mm diameter, 6 mm pitch, tolerance class 7e).

Trapezoidal threads are defined as follows by ISO standards:

Tr 60×9

where Tr designates a trapezoidal thread, 60 is the nominal diameter in millimeters, and 9 is the pitch in millimeters. When there is no suffix it is a single start thread. If there is a suffix then the value after the multiplication sign is the lead and the value in the parentheses is the pitch. For example:

Tr 60×18(P9)LH

would denote two starts, as the lead divided by the pitch is two. The "LH" denotes a left hand thread.

Standard trapezoidal thread pitches for metric diameters
Nominal diameter D (mm)	Thread pitch P (mm)	Ac (mm)
8	1,5	0,15
10	2	0,25
12	3	0,25
14, 16, 20	4	0,25
24, 28	5	0,25
32, 36	6	0,5
40, 44	7	0,5
48, 52	8	0,5
60	9	0,5
70, 80	10	0,5
90, 100	12	0,5
200	18	0,5
300	24	0,5

== Other trapezoidal threads ==
For maintaining air conditioning systems using R134a gas, a non standard "ACME" thread is specified for gas canisters.

Thread pitch for R134a gas canisters
Nominal diameter (in)	Thread pitch (in)	Thread density (in^{−1})
1/2	1/16	16

== See also ==
- Ball screw
- Buttress thread
- Leadscrew

== Sources ==
=== Bibliography ===
- Bhandari, V.B. (2007). Design of Machine Elements. Tata McGraw-Hill. ISBN 978-0-07-061141-2.
- Jones, Franklin D. Machine Shop Training Course. Vol. 1 (5th ed.). New York: Industrial Press. ISBN 978-0-8311-1039-0. OCLC 661244.
- Oberg, Erik (1908). Handbook of Small Tools: Comprising Threading Tools, Taps, Dies, Cutters, Drills, and Reamers, Together with a Complete Treatise on Screw-Thread Systems. New York: John Wiley & Sons.
- Shigley, Joseph E.; Mischke, Charles R.; Budynas, Richard Gordon (2003). Mechanical Engineering Design (7th ed.). McGraw Hill. ISBN 978-0-07-252036-1.
