= Vise =

Apparatus for securing a workpiece

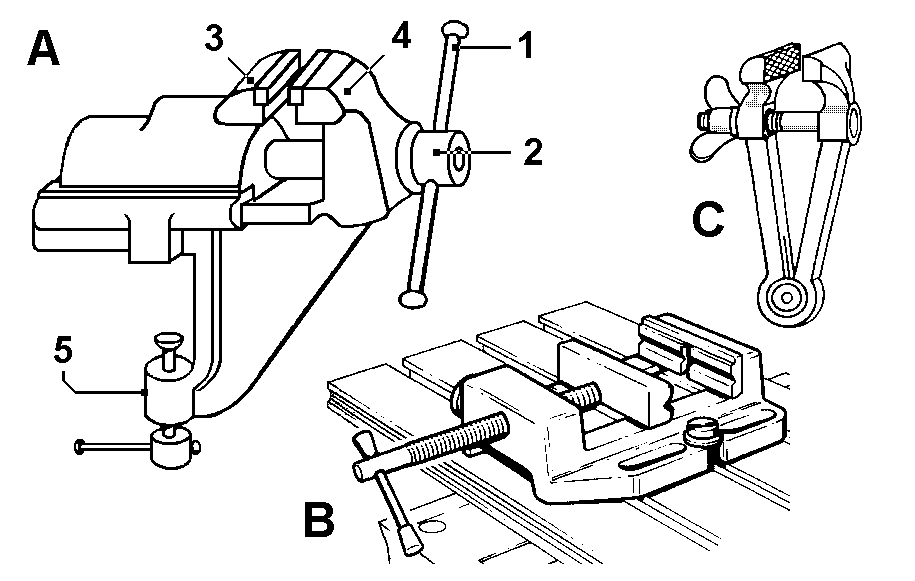
A bench vise, B machine vise, C hand vise

A vise or vice (British English) is a mechanical apparatus used to secure an object to allow work to be performed on it. Vises have two parallel jaws, one fixed and the other movable, threaded in and out by a screw and lever. The jaws are often flat but may have grooves, adapt to the shape of the workpiece or be custom made.

A vise grip is not a vise but a pair of lever-actuated locking pliers.

== Etymology ==
The etymology of vise can be tracked via Middle English vys Anglo-French vyz from Latin vitis "vine". The tight grip of the mechanical device was likened to that of the twines of the plant.

== Types ==
=== Face ===
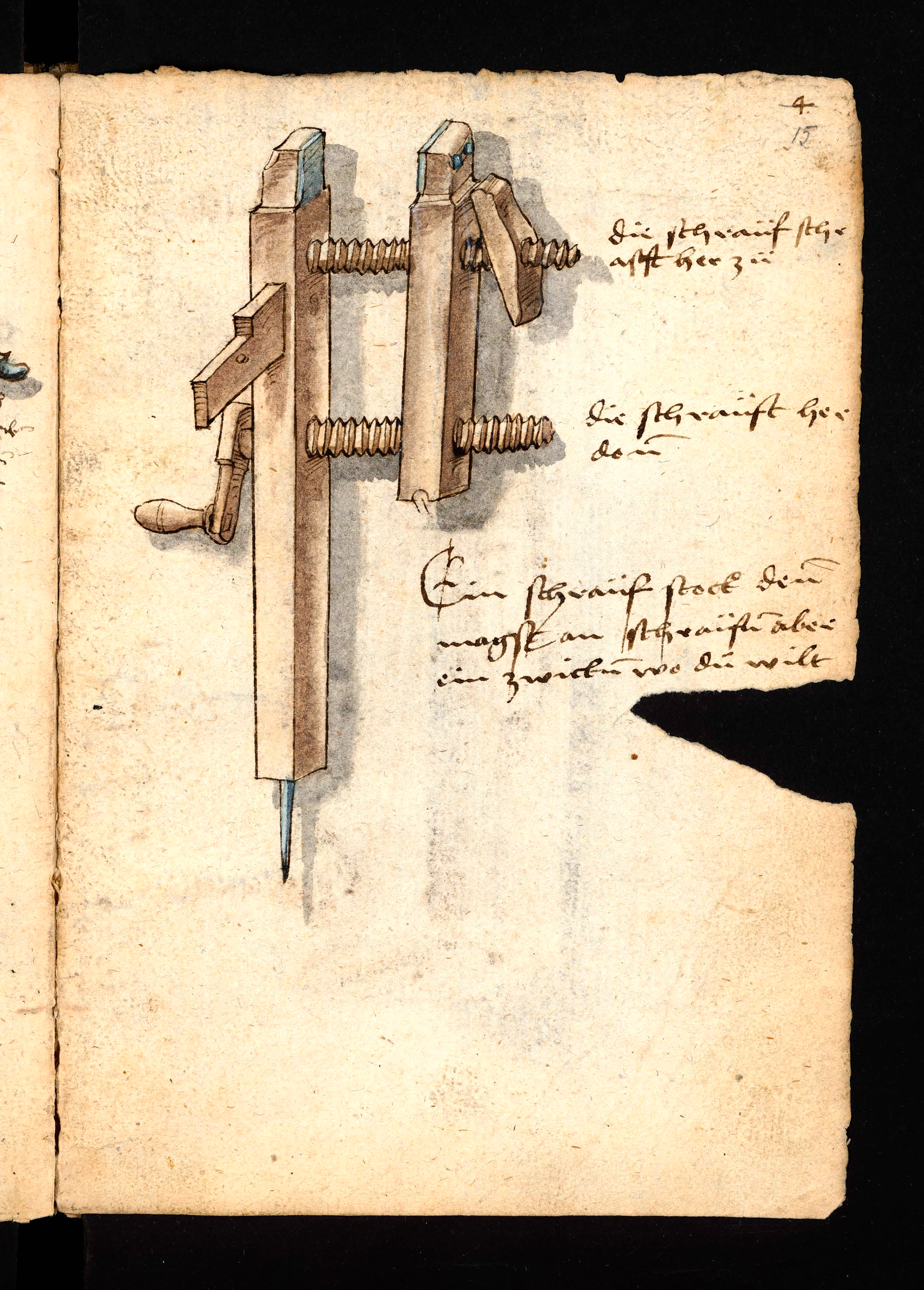
Wooden vise from Löffelholz-Codex, Nuremberg 1505

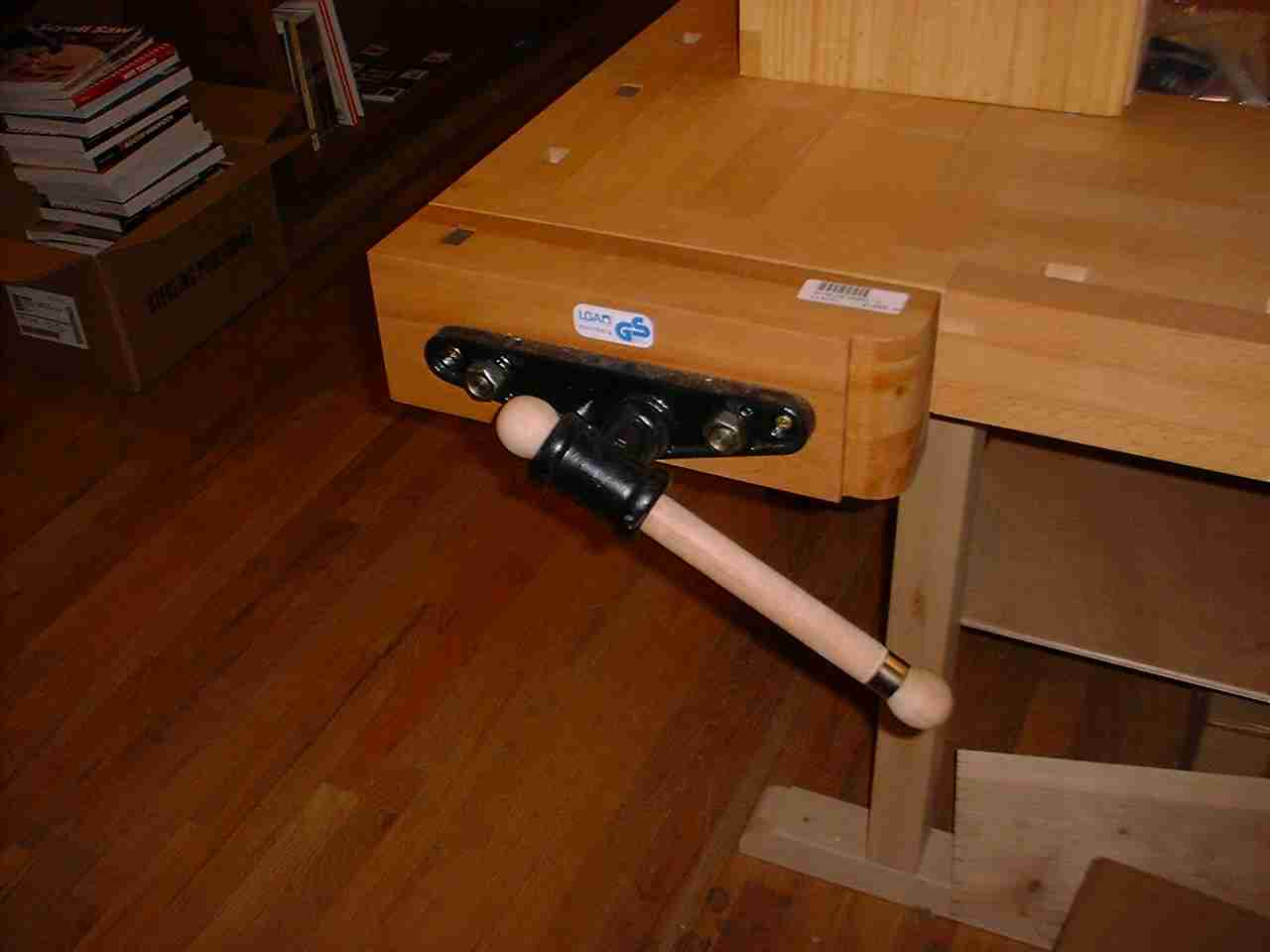
Woodworker's face vise, with entirely wooden jaws

A face vise is the standard woodworking vise, always securely attached to a workbench flush with its work surface. Its jaws are made of wood or metal, the latter usually faced with wood, called cheeks, to avoid marring the work. The movable jaw may include a retractable dog to hold work against a bench dog.

A "quick-release" woodworker's vise employs a split nut that allows the screw to engage or disengage with a half-turn of the handle. When disengaged the movable jaw may be moved in or out throughout its entire range of motion, vastly speeding up the process of adjustment. Common thread types are Acme and buttress.

Traditional woodworking workbench vises are commonly either face vises, attached to the front of the workbench near the left end of its long side (for a right-handed worker), or end (or tail) vises, attached to or forming part of the right side of the narrow end of the bench.

=== Engineer's ===
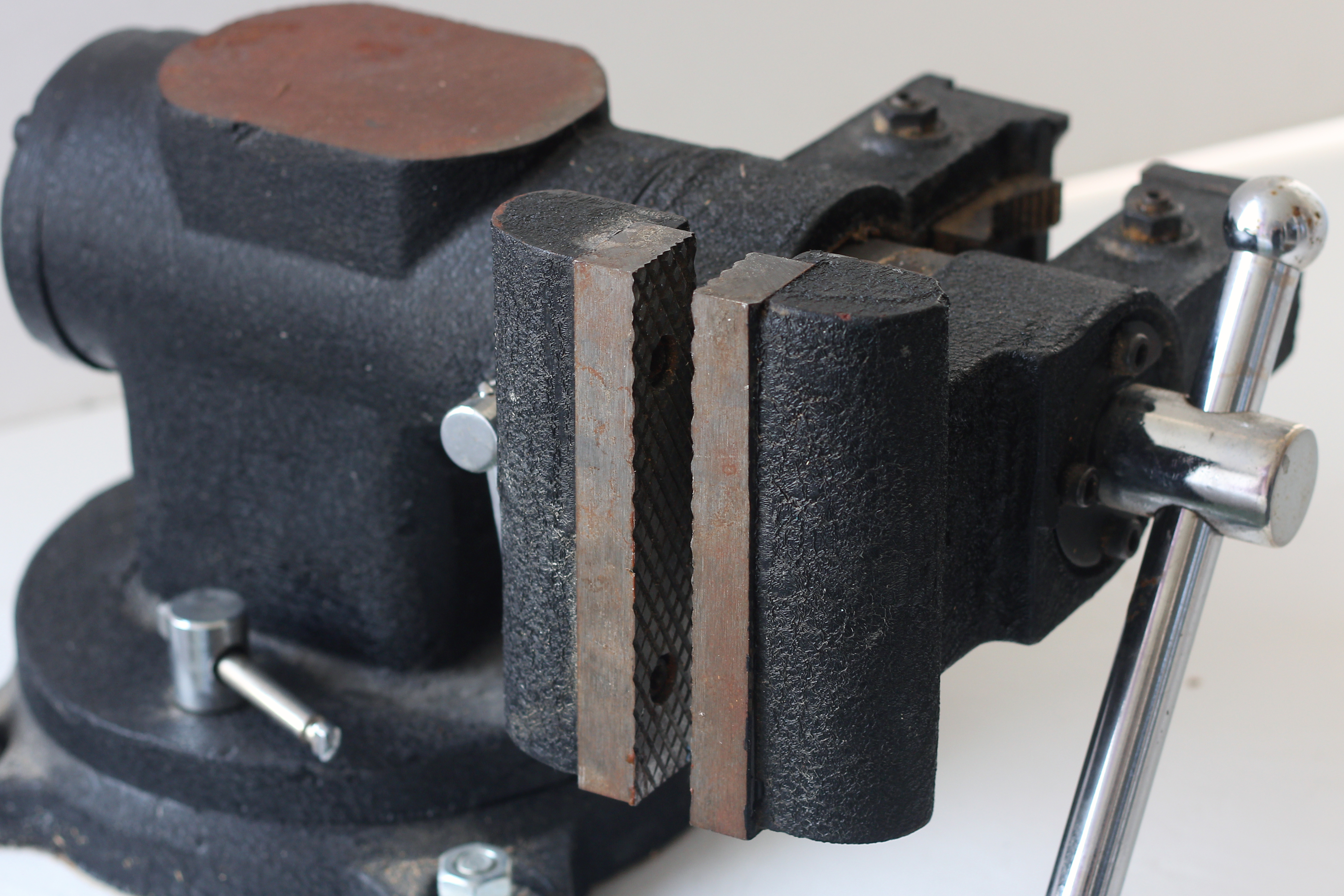
The head of this engineer's vise can swivel

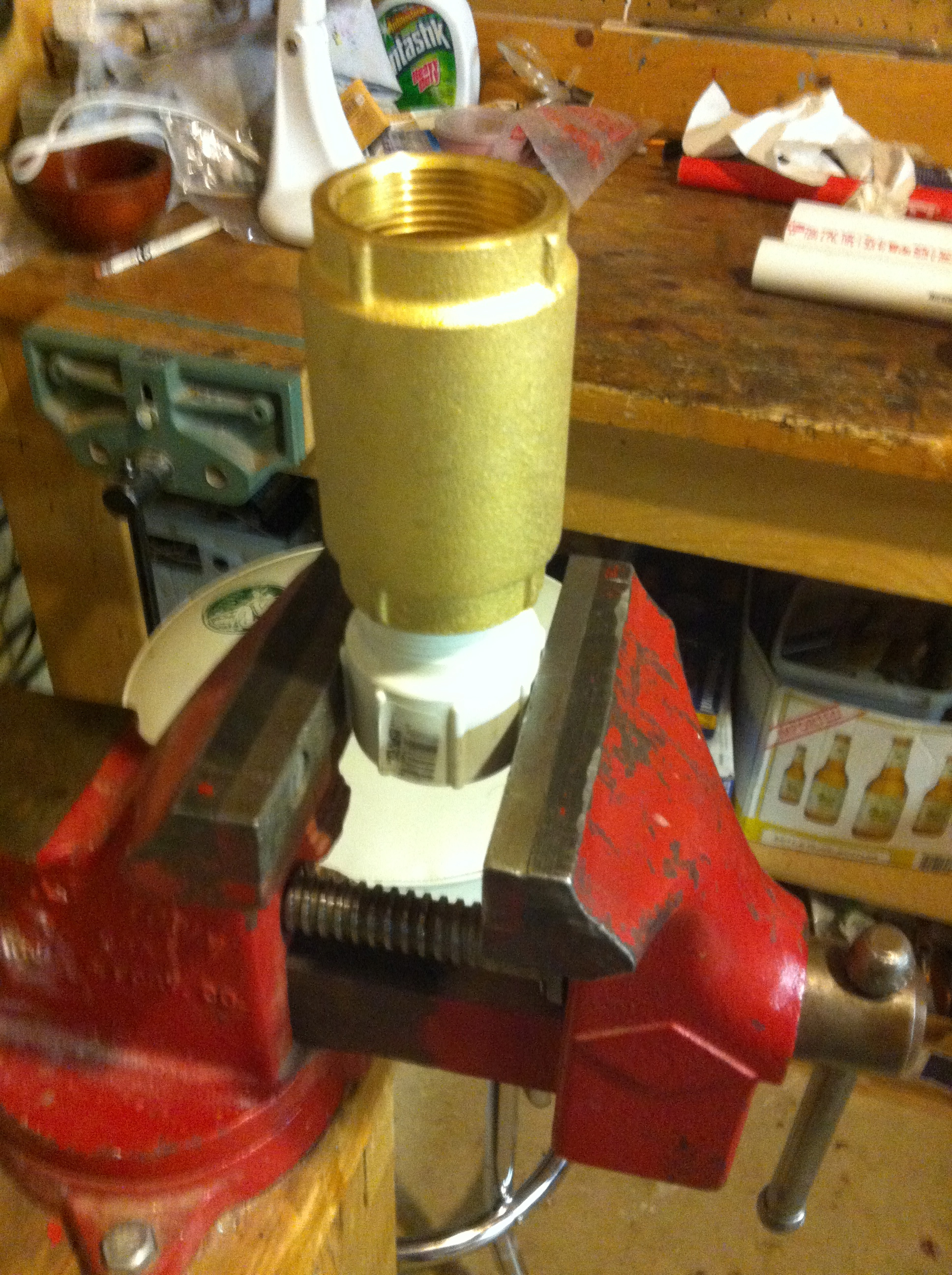
Basic workshop grade "bench" vise

An engineer's vise, also known as a metalworking vise, machinist's vise, or, informally, a "bench vise", is used to clamp metal instead of wood. It is used to hold metal when filing or cutting. It is sometimes made of cast steel or malleable cast iron, but most are made of cast iron. The jaws are often separate and replaceable, usually engraved with serrated or diamond teeth. Soft jaw covers made of aluminum, copper, wood (for woodworking) or plastic may be used to protect delicate work, such as fixating a chainsaw bar while sharpening the cutting chain. The jaw opening of an engineer's vise generally equals its jaw width, though it may be wider.

An engineer's vise is bolted onto the top surface of a workbench, with the face of the fixed jaw just forward of its front edge. The vise may include other features such as a small anvil on the back of its body. Most engineer's vises have a swivel base. Many homeowner's bench vises have an exposed screw.

==== Variants ====
===== Combination =====
A combination-vise combines an engineer-style vise with a subsidiary set of curved serrated jaws below the main for clamping pipe. A pivoting base is standard.

===== Clamp-on =====
A clamp-on vise is a light-duty bench vise secured to a board, table, or bench by a vise-type screw on its base which rarely is able to pivot.

===== Vacuum-mounted =====
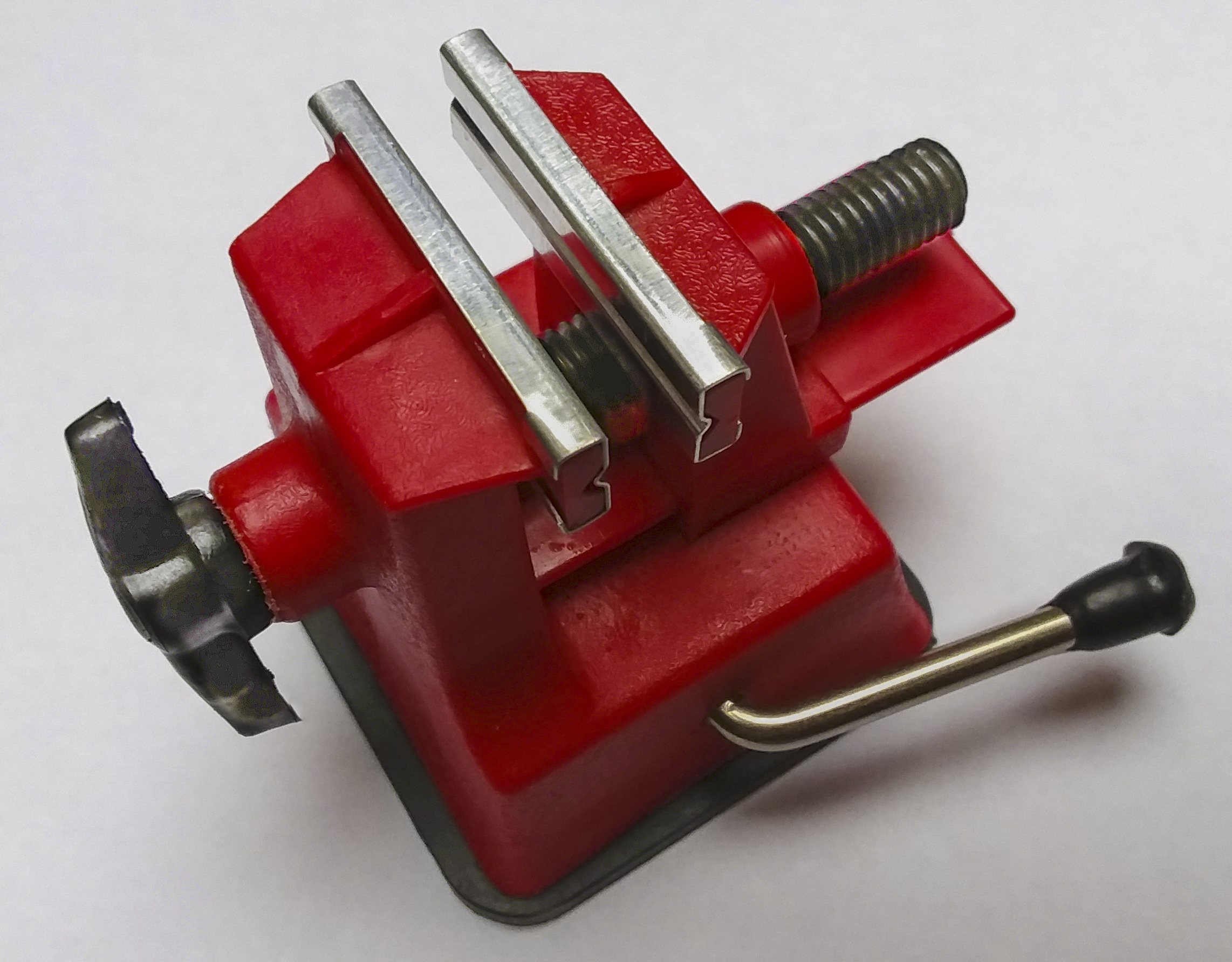
A miniature vise with a suction cup base

A vacuum-mounted vise is a small engineer's vise secured by a suction cup base and is typically used by hobbyists for very light-duty work.

=== Machine ===
Machine vises are mounted on drill presses, grinding machines and milling machines. Abrasive chop saws have a coarse-threaded or cam-actuated machine-type vise built into the saw.

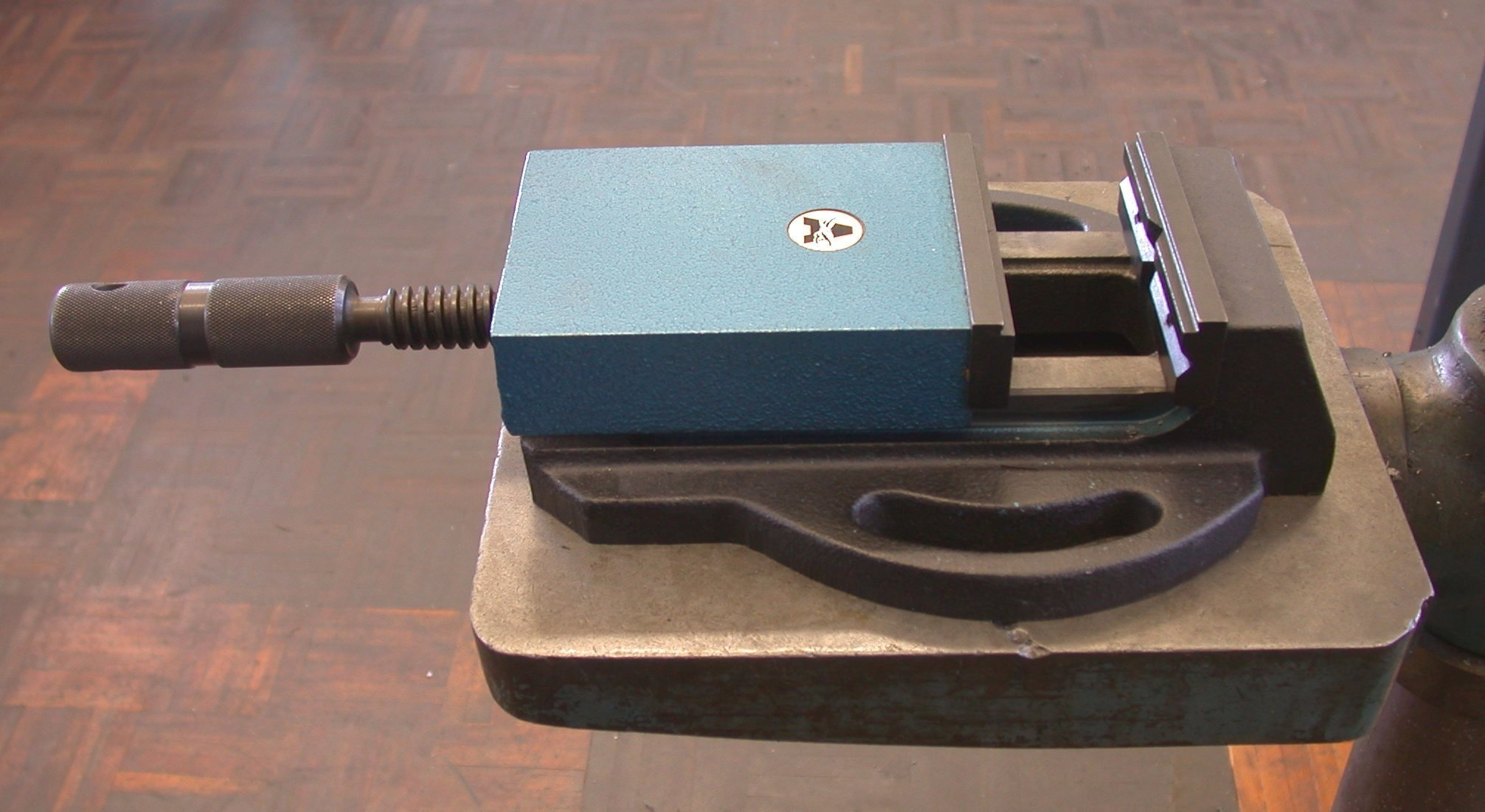
A small machine vise used in a drill press

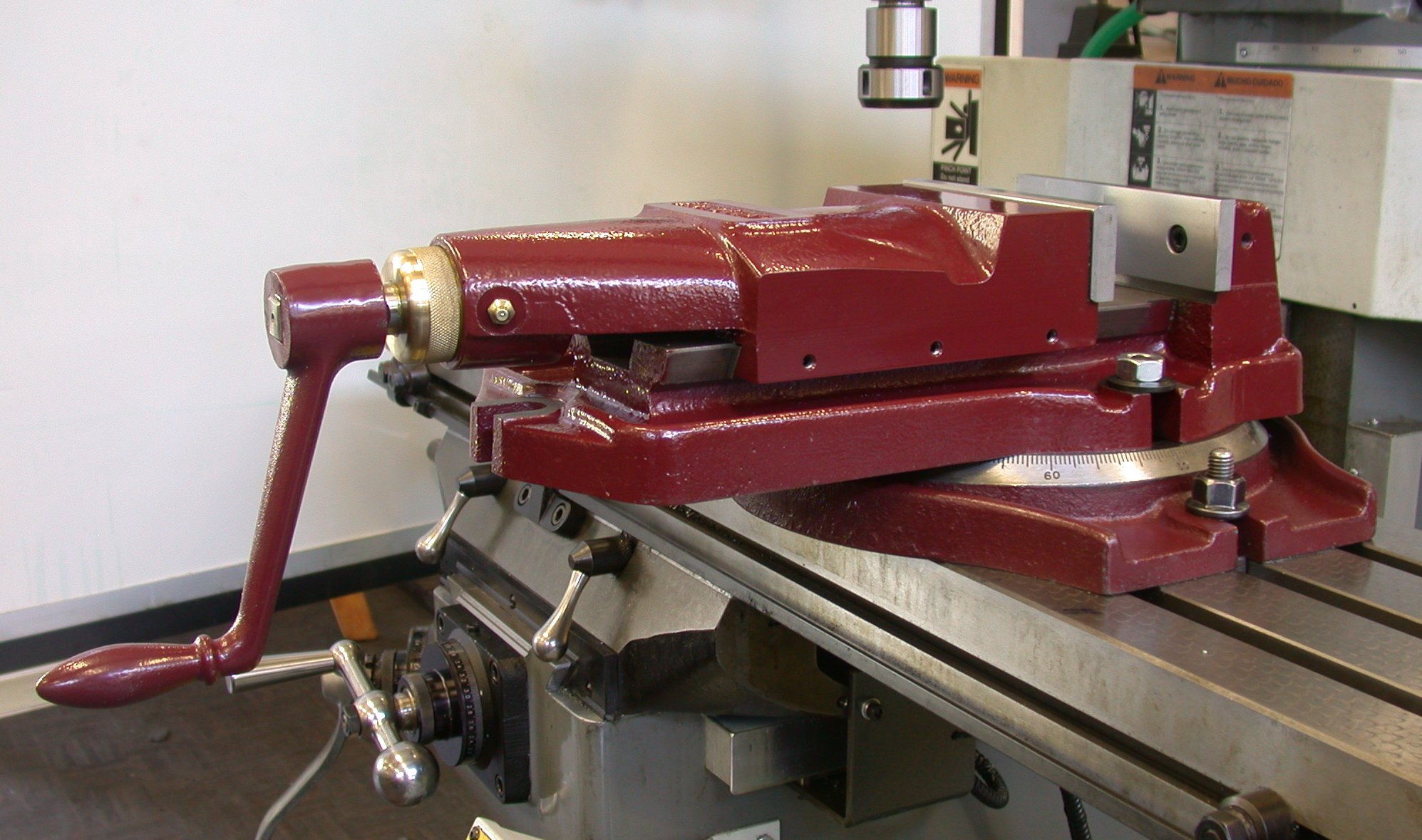
A machine vise that can be rotated

Aluminum soft jaw shown holding five parts at a time in a CNC milling machine

=== Pipe ===
A pipe vise is used by a plumber to hold pipes for threading and cutting. There are two main styles, yoke and chain. The yoke uses a top-mounted screw to clamp the pipe between two fixed angled jaws at its base; the chain style secures the pipe by wrapping it within a chain designed to adjust to length by link, tightened by a cam lever.

=== Other ===
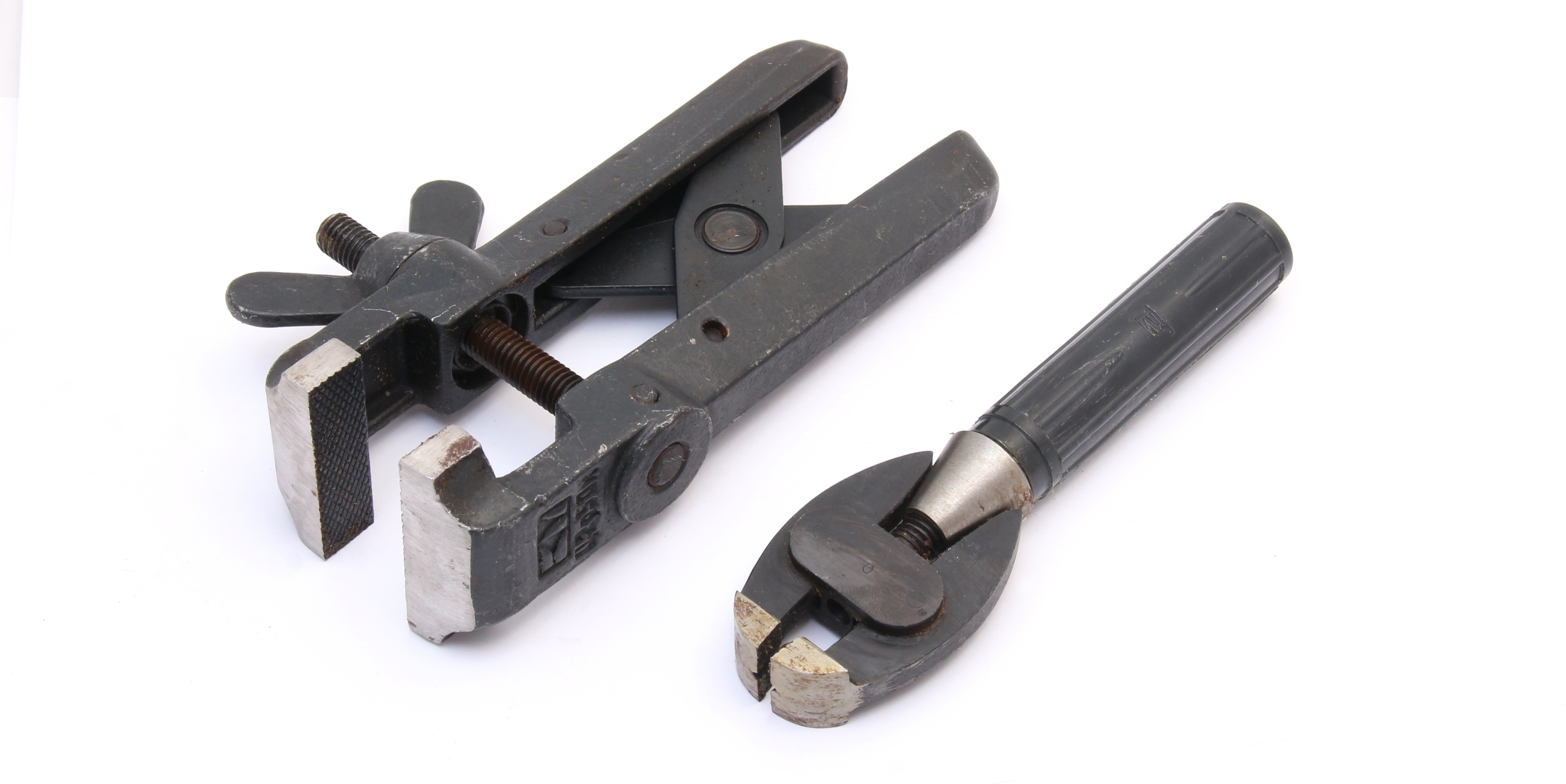
Hand vices

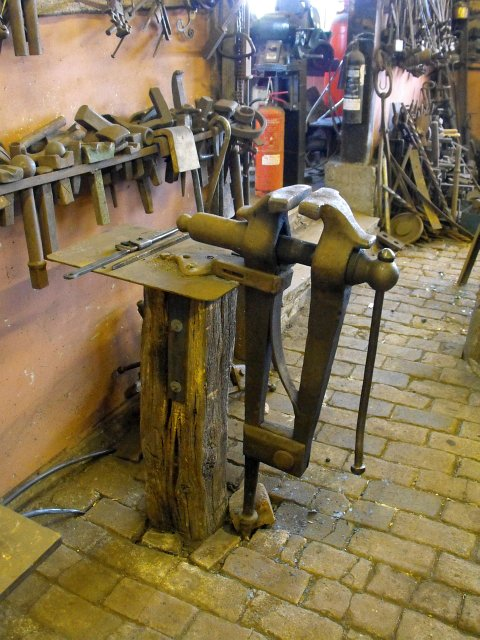
Post vise

Other kinds of vises include:

- Hand vise
- Compound slide vise; a more complex machine vise. It allows speed and precision in the placement of the work.
- Cross vise, which can be adjusted using leadscrews in the X and Y axes; these are useful if many holes need to be drilled in the same workpiece using a drill press. Compare router table.
- Off-center vise
- Angle vise, with two jaws closing against a right angle
- Sine vise, which use gauge blocks to set up a highly accurate angle
- Rotary vise
- Diemakers' vise
- Saw vise – used for sharpening hand saws
- Pin vise (for holding thin, long cylindrical objects by one end, or used as a drill (scale modeler's pin vise))
- Jewellers' vise
- Fly tying vise, used to secure fishing hook in fly tying
- Leg vise or post vise, which is attached to a bench but also supported from the ground so as to be stable under very heavy use, as by an auto body repairperson or blacksmith
- Shaker broom vise
- Rigging vise, otherwise known as a triangle vise or splicing vise, which has three jaws. Used to close thimbles and splice rope, cable, and wire rope.
- Mantle Vise, more recently referred to as a Fractal Vise, used to hold workpieces with complex forms
- Adaptive jaw vise, uses ball bearings to adapt the shape of the jaws to the workpiece
- Magnetic vise
- Vertical vise

== See also ==
- Parallels
