= Loppo =

Finnish firearms manufacturer

Oy Loppo Production Ltd is a Finnish firearms manufacturer in Savonlinna founded in 1976 which is known for their silhouette pistols, including those based on rebuilt Tikka M55 steel actions or in-house made actions of aluminium and steel. The silhouette pistols of Aseseppä Löppönen or "Gunsmith Loppo" has been favored by three-time world champion in metallic silhouette shooting Rauno Ärväs. Loppo was the second pistol to come on the IMSSU Production list after the Excalibur pistol.

== History ==
The Loppo company was founded by Martti "Myrä" Löppönen which started his career in 1976 by building revolvers and pistols for silhouette shooting as well as other custom firearms by order. Among chamberings used in these pistols was the wildcat cartridge 30-39 which is a 7.62×39 mm case with a 7.82-mm bullet (0.308 inch) instead of 7.9 mm (0.311 inch). Loppo is also known for having developed the rifle Loppo-Petran (which has similarities with the Valmet Hunter M83) of which around 300 were manufactured, and the Loppo Super 2000. According to Loppo's own website he has also had a strong influence on the development of practical and silhouette shooting as a sport in Finland. In 1996 the current company Oy Loppo Production Ltd was founded. In 2007 Löppönen was focusing on converting military firearms for hunting use and deactivating firearms by order. Martti has also done arms specialist consultancy, and has exhibited and presented historic firearms and collector's firearms.

== See also ==
- Jalonen, another Finnish firearms manufacturer
