= Thread protector =

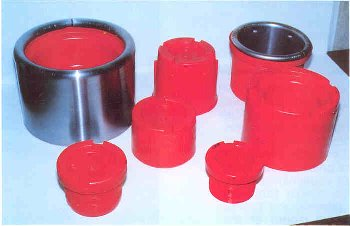
Various thread protectors

A thread protector is used to protect the threads of a pipe during transportation and storage. Thread protectors are generally manufactured from plastic or steel and can be applied to the pipe manually or automatically (by machine).

Thread protectors are used frequently in the oil and gas industry to protect pipes during transportation to the oil and gas fields. Metal thread protectors can be cleaned and re-used, while plastic thread protectors are often collected and either re-used or recycled.

Thread protectors are widely used on firearms to protect threaded barrels. Some firearms are manufactured with thread and protectors in the factory, but most thread protectors are part of the aftermarket process of fitting a sound moderator (silencer), muzzle brake or flash hider. They protect the threads from mechanical damage and ensure the center lines line up when the muzzle device is replaced.
