= Lakelander rifle =

Lakelander / Varberger
- Type: Bolt-action
- Place of origin: Sweden

Production history
- Designer: Lars Andersson
- Manufacturer: Tampereen Asepaja Oy, Varberger, Kongsberg Våpenfabrikk, Norsk Forsvarsteknologi, Kongsberg Small Arms
- Produced: 1970s-1990s

Specifications
- Mass: 3,400 g (7.5 lb)
- Length: 1,110 mm (44 in)
- Barrel length: 580 mm (23 in)
- Cartridge: .243 Win, 6.5x55 mm, .270 Win, 7x64 mm, .308 Win, .30-06, 9.3x62 mm

Lakelander and Varberger can refer to several rifles based on the design of Lars Andersson from Sweden. These rifles include the Finnish-produced TAP-375, the Swedish-produced Varberger 757, 717, 711 and 777, and the Norwegian-produced Kongsberg Lakelander 389 and Kongsberg 393. In addition, the Lakelander 375 was manufactured in Finland by TAP, as well as in Sweden by various manufacturers.

The history of these models are complex, with a total of 5 bankruptcies in different companies, and trials on patents and rights. All the aforementioned models had a reputation for good build quality.

== History ==
It is assumed that the Swede Lars Andersson published the original design at an uncertain point in time before 1976 through a magazine advertisement. The firearm was then presented with the name "TAP-174", and had 12 locking lugs and a detachable magazine. The reason that this brochure is assumed to date back before 1976 is the fact that Andersson received a gold medal for this construction at an inventors' fair in Brussels in 1976, and this medal is not mentioned in the advertisement. TAP was an abbreviation for the Finnish factory name Tampereen Asepaja Oy. In 1975, Tampereen Asepaja Oy launched the TAP-375 model, which allegedly was designed by the two Finns Torsti Laaksonen og Jali Timari. In total, over 4000 TAP-375 were manufactured in the period from 1975-1979 before the patent, according to Laaksonen, was sold to Kongsberg Våpenfabrikk (later Norsk Forsvarsteknologi (NFT), from 1995 Kongsberg Gruppen) in Norway.

In 1981, an advertisement magazine was printed in Jönköping in Småland, Sweden, where the rifle had changed its name to «Lakelander 375». The specifications in this brochure corresponds well with the later Varberger rifle, with two exceptions: Lakelander 375 had 9 locking lugs (Varberger would get 6) and a three-point safety (Varberger would get a two-point safety). The design also differen from TAP-174 by having a simplified bolt with an integrated guide sleeve, as well as a different rotating magazine and a special recoil lug. The firearm was first manufactured in Finland, and the first commercial model was named Lakelander TAP-375. There were amongst others a unique model for moose biathlon, a sport which was developed in Finland in the 1970s.

After a while the manufacturing was moved to Sweden. Lakelander was amongst others produced under the name Varberger by Norråkers vapen in Norråker, Ångermanland. The model was called NV for Norråkers vapen. At some point in time, Varbergs Finmekanik simplified the design and introduced Varberger 757 as their base model with 6 locking lugs instead of 9, and with a two-point safety. A budget model was also introduced, named Varberger 717 (later 711), which had 3 locking lugs. Varberger 777 was a more expensive and better looking model which had 6 locking lugs, but which otherwise was similar to the 717. The Varberger models were available in most common chamberings, and were manufactured around 1991-1998. The Varberger rifles were only drilled for lose scope bases, and bases for Remington 700 allegedly fits.

NFT also started to produce a rifle based on the original Lakelander rifle. This was named Kongsberg 389, and the name comes from the first rifle being delivered in the 3rd month of 1989. Kongsberg 389 had 3 locking lugs. A prototype is on display at the Norwegian Mining Museum. When Kongsberg Våpenfabrikk went bankrupt in 1987, some of the employees bought the part of the factory engaged in rifle production, but lost the right to use the Lakelander name. Hence, the next model was called Kongsberg 393 (without Lakelander) since the first rifle was delivered in the 3rd month of 1993. Kongsberg 393 has an integrated weaver rail milled into its receiver. Some Lakelander rifles came with open barrel-mounted sights. The rifle was delivered with different types of stocks, with trim alternatives including "standard", "luxe" and "classic". Among known weaknesses of the Kongsberg Lakelander is that the trigger guard (made of plastic) can crack, that the stock can crack at the rear stock screw, and that the from stock screw can rub against the bolt.

Other differences between Kongsberg and Varberg includes the Varberger having a two-point safety, while the Kongsberg has a three-point safety. The bolt stops are also different, and have a reputation for being somewhat more robust on the Kongsberg. Varberger have a trigger guard of steel, and trigger guards in anodized aluminium are available on the aftermarked. The lock time is short, and the mechanism is sensitive for failure to fire if the bolt handle is not fully locked. Otherwise, many spare parts are said to interchange.

== See also ==
- Krag–Jørgensen
- Kongsberg KV59
- Kongsberg M67
- Husqvarna 1900
- Mannlicher–Schönauer
