= Square thread form =

Screw thread profile with a square cross-section

Dimensions of a square thread form

The square thread form is a common screw thread profile, used in high load applications such as leadscrews and jackscrews. It gets its name from the square cross-section of the thread. It is the lowest friction and most efficient thread form, but it is difficult to fabricate.

== Advantages & disadvantages ==
The greatest advantage of square threads is that they have a much higher intrinsic efficiency than trapezoidal threads (Acme or metric trapezoidal). Due to the lack of a thread angle there is no radial pressure, or bursting pressure, on the nut. This also increases the nut life.

The greatest disadvantage is the difficulty in machining such a thread. The single-point cutting tools or taps and dies used to cut the thread cannot have efficient rake and relief angles (because of the square form), which makes the cutting slow and difficult. Square threads also cannot carry as much load as a trapezoidal thread, because the root of the square thread is smaller. Also, there is no way to compensate for wear on the nut, so it must be replaced when worn out.

== Classification ==
Square threads are defined as follows by ISO standards:

$$Sq\,60 \times 9$$

where Sq designates a square thread, 60 is the nominal diameter in millimeters, and 9 is the pitch in millimeters. When there is no suffix it is a single start thread. If there is a suffix then the value after the multiplication sign is the lead and the value in the parentheses is the pitch. For example:

$$Sq\,60 \times 18 (P9) LH$$

would denoted two starts, as the lead divided by the pitch is two. The "LH" denotes a left hand thread.

Standard pitches for metric diameters
Nominal diameter [mm]	Pitch [mm]
22, 24, 26, 28	5
30, 32, 36	6
40, 44	7
48, 50, 52	8
55, 60	9
65, 70, 75, 80	10
85, 90, 95, 100	12
