= ISO 898 =

Standard for metric fasteners

ISO 898 is an international standard that defines mechanical and physical properties for metric fasteners. This standard is the origin for other standards that define properties for similar metric fasteners, such as SAE J1199 and ASTM F568M. It is divided into five (nonconsecutive) parts:

1. Bolts, screws and studs with specified property classes – Coarse thread and fine pitch thread

2. Nuts with specified proof load values – Coarse thread

3. Flat washers with specified property classes

5. Set screws and similar threaded fasteners not under tensile stresses

6. (Now withdrawn) Nuts with specified proof load values – Fine pitch thread

7. Torsional test and minimum torques for bolts and screws with nominal diameters 1 mm to 10 mm

With exception to part 7, which defines test standards, the parts of this standard define properties for fasteners made of carbon steel and alloy steel. The standards define that the testing must be performed at ambient temperatures, which is defined as between 10 and 35 °C (50 and 95 °F). The standards do not cover fasteners that would otherwise apply but require special properties, such as weldability or corrosion resistance.

== Part 1: Bolts, screws and studs with specified property classes – Coarse thread and fine pitch thread ==
Part 1 defines the mechanical properties of bolts, screws, and studs. It specifically applies to fasteners that have an ISO metric screw thread as defined in ISO 68-1. The properties are defined for M1.6-39 with coarse threads and M8-39 with fine threads. The diameter and pitch combinations must adhere to ISO 261 and ISO 262 and the thread tolerances must adhere to ISO 965 parts 1, 2, and 4.

Part 1 does not specify properties for fasteners that have head geometries that reduce the shear strength of the fastener, such as low head screws and countersunk heads. It also excludes set screws, which are covered under part 5.

== Part 2: Nuts with specified proof load values – Coarse thread ==
Part 2 defines the mechanical properties for coarse threaded nuts up to an M39 size and a height of at least half the nominal diameter.

== Part 3: Flat washers with specified property classes ==
Part 3 defines the mechanical and physical properties of flat washers, designed to be used in bolted joints in combination with other fasteners.

== Part 5: Set screws and similar threaded fasteners not under tensile stresses ==
Part 5 defines the mechanical properties for set screws and other fasteners not under tensile stresses. It defines properties for sizes M1.6 through M24.

== Part 6: Nuts with specified proof load values – Fine pitch thread ==
Part 6 has been withdrawn as of 20212 and been replaced by ISO 898-2:2012. It used to be same as part 2 except for fine threaded nuts that range from M8 to M39. Note that the working temperature range for these fasteners is −50 to 300 °C (−58 to 572 °F)

== Part 7: Torsional test and minimum torques for bolts and screws with nominal diameters 1 mm to 10 mm ==
Part 7 defines how to perform torsional tests on bolts and screws that have a nominal diameter less than or equal to 10 mm. This standard only applies to short screws and bolts with a nominal diameter between 3 and 10 mm.
