= ASTM F568M =

Standard for metric bolts, screws and studs

ASTM F568M is an ASTM International standard for metric bolts, screws and studs that are used in general engineering applications. It is titled: Standard Specification for Carbon and Alloy Steel Externally Threaded Metric Fasteners. It defines mechanical properties for fasteners that range from M1.6 to 100 in diameter. The standard was withdrawn in 2012. and has been replaced by ISO 898-1

This standard defines property classes, the metric equivalent of a screw grade, that are almost identical to those defined by ISO 898-1, except for the addition of the 8.8.3 and 10.9.3 classes. These two additional standards are fasteners that have the same mechanical properties as their base property class (i.e. 8.8 and 10.9), but are made from weathering steel. The standard is referenced by ASME B18.29.2M, which defines insert length selection for helical coil screw thread inserts.

This is a standard set by the standards organization ASTM International, a voluntary standards development organization that sets technical standards for materials, products, systems, and services.

== Mechanical properties ==
Head markings and mechanical properties
Head marking	Grade, material & condition	Nominal thread diameter size range [mm]	Proof strength [MPa]	Yield strength (min) [MPa]	Tensile strength (min) [MPa]	Core hardness [Rockwell]
	Class 4.6; Low or medium carbon steel	5–100	225	240	400	B67–95
	Class 4.8; Low or medium carbon steel; fully or partially annealed	1.6–16	310	340	420	B71–95
	Class 5.8; Low or medium carbon steel; cold worked	5–24	380	420	520	B82–95
	Class 8.8; Medium carbon steel; quench and tempered	Under 16 (inc.)	580	640	800	C18-31
	Class 8.8; Medium carbon steel; quench and tempered	17–72	600	660	830	C23–34
	Class 8.8 low carbon Low carbon boron steel; quench and tempered	17–72	600	660	830	C23–34
	Class 8.8.3; Atmospheric corrosion resistant steel; quench and tempered	17–72	600	660	830	C23–34
	Class 9.8; Medium carbon steel; quench and tempered	1.6–16	650	720	900	C28–37
	Class 9.8 low carbon Low carbon boron steel; quench and tempered	1.6–16	650	720	900	C28–37
	Class 10.9; Alloy steel; quench and tempered	5–100	830	940	1040	C32–39
	Class 10.9 low carbon Low carbon boron steel; quench and tempered	5–100	830	940	1040	C32–39
	Class 10.9.3; Atmospheric corrosion resistant steel; quench and tempered	5–100	830	940	1040	C32–39
	Class 12.9; Alloy steel; quench and tempered	1.6–100	970	1100	1220	C39–44

== See also ==
- ASTM A325
- ISO metric screw thread
- Shear force
- Ultimate tensile strength
