= ASTM A354 =

ASTM International standard for externally threaded fastners

ASTM A354 is an ASTM International standard that defines chemical and mechanical properties for alloy steel bolts, screws, studs, and other externally threaded fasteners. It is officially titled: Standard Specification for Quenched and Tempered Alloy Steel Bolts, Studs, and Other Externally Threaded Fasteners.

This is a standard set by the standards organization ASTM International, a voluntary standards development organizations that sets technical standards for materials, products, systems, and services.

== Mechanical properties ==
This standard defines the properties for fasteners up to 4 inches in diameter. They are not to be used in applications where they are tensioned to more than 50% of their tensile strength. In those applications structural heavy hex bolts are to be used, as defined by ASTM A490, even though they have the same strength.

Head markings and mechanical properties
Head marking	Grade	Nominal size range [in]	Proof strength [ksi]	Yield strength (min) [ksi]	Tensile strength (min) [ksi]	Core hardness [Rockwell]
	Grade BC	1/4–2-1/2 (inc.)	105	109	125	C26–36
	Grade BC	2-1/2–4	95	99	115	C22–33
	Grade BD	1/4–2-1/2 (inc.)	120	130	150	C33–39
	Grade BD	2-1/2–4	105	115	140	C31–39

== Recommended nuts ==
The standard also specifies what nuts are recommended for use with the defined fasteners. Note that nuts of a greater strength can also be used.

Fastener grade & surface finish	Nut grade & style
BC; plain or a coating of insufficient thickness to require over-tapped nuts	C; heavy hex
BC; zinc-coated or a coating that requires over-tapped nuts	DH; heavy hex
BD; all finishes	DH; heavy hex
