= Screw =

Type of fastener characterized by a thread wrapped around a cylinder core

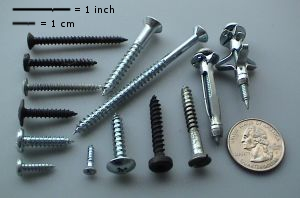
An assortment of screws, and a US quarter for size comparison

A wood screw: a) head; b) non-threaded shank; c) threaded shank; d) tip

A screw is an externally helical threaded fastener capable of being tightened or released by a twisting force (torque) to the head. The most common use of screws is to hold objects together and there are many forms for a variety of materials. Screws might be inserted into holes in assembled parts or a screw may form its own thread.

The screw head on one end has a slot or other feature that commonly requires a tool to transfer the twisting force. Common tools for driving screws include screwdrivers, spanners, wrenches, coins and hex keys. The head is usually larger than the body, which provides a bearing surface and keeps the screw from being driven deeper than its length; an exception being the set screw (aka grub screw). The cylindrical portion of the screw from the underside of the head to the tip is called the shank; it may be fully or partially threaded with the distance between each thread called the pitch.

Most screws are tightened by clockwise rotation, which is called a right-hand thread. Screws with a left-hand thread are used in exceptional cases, such as where the screw will be subject to counterclockwise torque, which would tend to loosen a right-hand screw. For this reason, the left-side pedal of a bicycle has a left-hand thread.

The screw mechanism is one of the six classical simple machines defined by Renaissance scientists.

== History ==
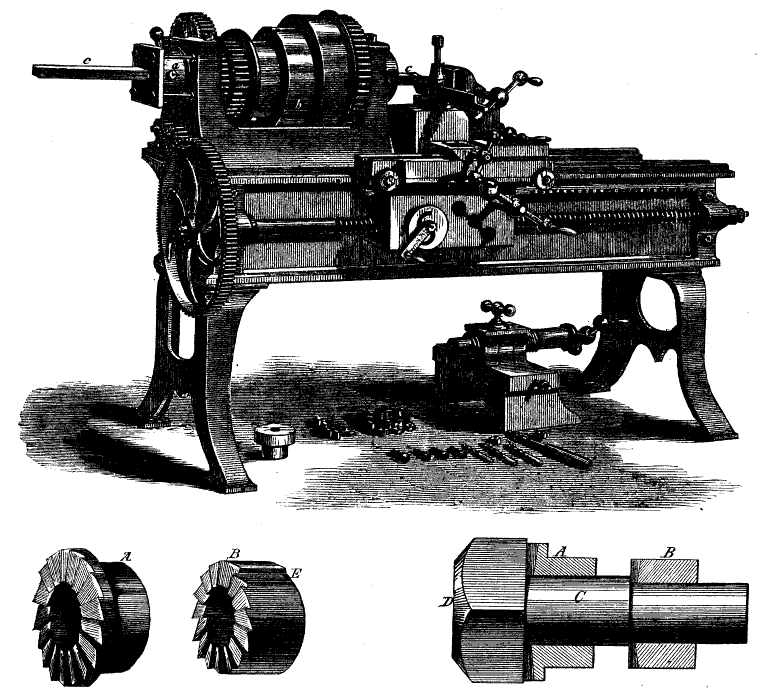
A lathe of 1871, equipped with leadscrew and change gears for single-point screw-cutting

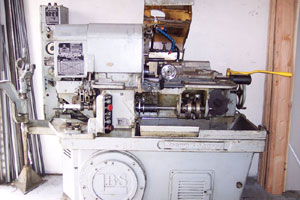
A Brown & Sharpe single-spindle screw machine

Fasteners had become widespread involving concepts such as dowels and pins, wedging, mortises and tenons, dovetails, nailing (with or without clenching the nail ends), forge welding, and many kinds of binding with cord made of leather or fibre, using many kinds of knots. The screw was one of the last of the simple machines to be invented. It first appeared in Mesopotamia during the Neo-Assyrian period (911-609) BC, and then later appeared in Ancient Egypt and Ancient Greece where it was described by the Greek mathematician Archytas of Tarentum (428–350 BC). By the 1st century BC, wooden screws were commonly used throughout the Mediterranean world in screw presses for pressing olive oil from olives and for pressing juice from grapes in winemaking. The first documentation of the screwdriver is in the medieval Housebook of Wolfegg Castle, a manuscript written sometime between 1475 and 1490. However they probably did not become widespread until after 1800, once threaded fasteners had become commodified.

Metal screws used as fasteners were rare in Europe before the 15th century, if known at all. The metal screw did not become a common fastener until machine tools for mass production developed toward the end of the 18th century. This development blossomed in the 1760s and 1770s. along two separate paths that soon converged:

The first path was pioneered by brothers Job and William Wyatt of Staffordshire, UK, who patented in 1760 a machine that one might today best call a screw machine of an early and prescient sort. It made use of a leadscrew to guide the cutter to produce the desired pitch, and the slot was cut with a rotary file while the main spindle held still (presaging live tools on lathes 250 years later). Not until 1776 did the Wyatt brothers have a wood-screw factory up and running. Their enterprise failed, but new owners soon made it prosper, and in the 1780s they were producing 16,000 screws a day with only 30 employees—the kind of industrial productivity and output volume that would later become characteristic of modern industry but which was revolutionary at the time.

Meanwhile, English instrument-maker Jesse Ramsden (1735–1800) was working on the toolmaking and instrument-making end of the screw-cutting problem, and in 1777 he invented the first satisfactory screw-cutting lathe. The British engineer Henry Maudslay (1771–1831) gained fame by popularizing such lathes with his screw-cutting lathes of 1797 and 1800, containing the trifecta of leadscrew, slide rest, and change-gear gear train, all in the right proportions for industrial machining. In a sense he unified the paths of the Wyatts and Ramsden and did for machine screws what had already been done for wood screws, i.e., significant easing of production spurring commodification. His firm remained a leader in machine tools for decades afterward. A misquoting of James Nasmyth popularized the notion that Maudslay had invented the slide rest, but this was incorrect; however, his lathes helped to popularize it.

These developments of the 1760–1800 era, with the Wyatts and Maudslay as arguably the most important drivers, caused great increase in the use of threaded fasteners. Standardization of threadforms began almost immediately, but it was not quickly completed; it has been an evolving process ever since. Further improvements to the mass production of screws continued to push unit prices lower and lower for decades to come, throughout the 19th century. The mass production thus began: that of wood screws (metal screws for fixing wood) in a specialized, single-purpose, high-volume-production machine tool; and that of the low-count, toolroom-style production of machine screws or bolts (V-thread) with easy selection among various pitches (whatever the machinist happened to need on any given day).

In 1821 Hardman Philips built the first screw factory in the United States – on Moshannon Creek, near Philipsburg – for the manufacture of blunt metal screws. An expert in screw manufacture, Thomas Lever, was brought over from England to run the factory. The mill used steam and water power, with hardwood charcoal as fuel. The screws were made from wire prepared by "rolling and wire drawing apparatus" from iron manufactured at a nearby forge. The screw mill was not a commercial success; it eventually failed due to competition from the lower-cost, gimlet-pointed screw, and ceased operations in 1836.

The American development of the turret lathe (1840s) and of automatic screw machines derived from it (1870s) drastically reduced the unit cost of threaded fasteners by increasingly automating the machine-tool control. This cost reduction spurred ever greater use of screws.

Throughout the 19th century, the most commonly used forms of screw head (that is, drive types) were simple internal-wrenching straight slots and external-wrenching squares and hexagons. These were easy to machine and served most applications adequately. Rybczynski describes a flurry of patents for alternative drive types in the 1860s through 1890s, but explains that these were patented but not manufactured due to the difficulties and expense of doing so at the time. In 1908, Canadian P. L. Robertson was the first to make the internal-wrenching square socket drive a practical reality by developing just the right design (slight taper angles and overall proportions) to allow the head to be stamped easily but successfully, with the metal cold forming as desired rather than being sheared or displaced in unwanted ways. Practical manufacture of the internal-wrenching hexagon drive (hex socket) shortly followed in 1911.

In the early 1930s American Henry F. Phillips popularized the Phillips-head screw, with a cross-shaped internal drive. Later improved-head screws were developed, more compatible with screwdrivers not of the exactly right head size: Pozidriv and Supadriv. Phillips screws and screwdrivers are to some extent compatible with those for the newer types, but with the risk of damaging the heads of tightly fastened screws.

Threadform standardization further improved in the late 1940s, when the ISO metric screw thread and the Unified Thread Standard were defined.

Precision screws, for controlling motion rather than fastening, developed around the turn of the 19th century, and represented one of the central technical advances, along with flat surfaces, that enabled the Industrial Revolution. They are key components of micrometers and lathes.

== Manufacture ==

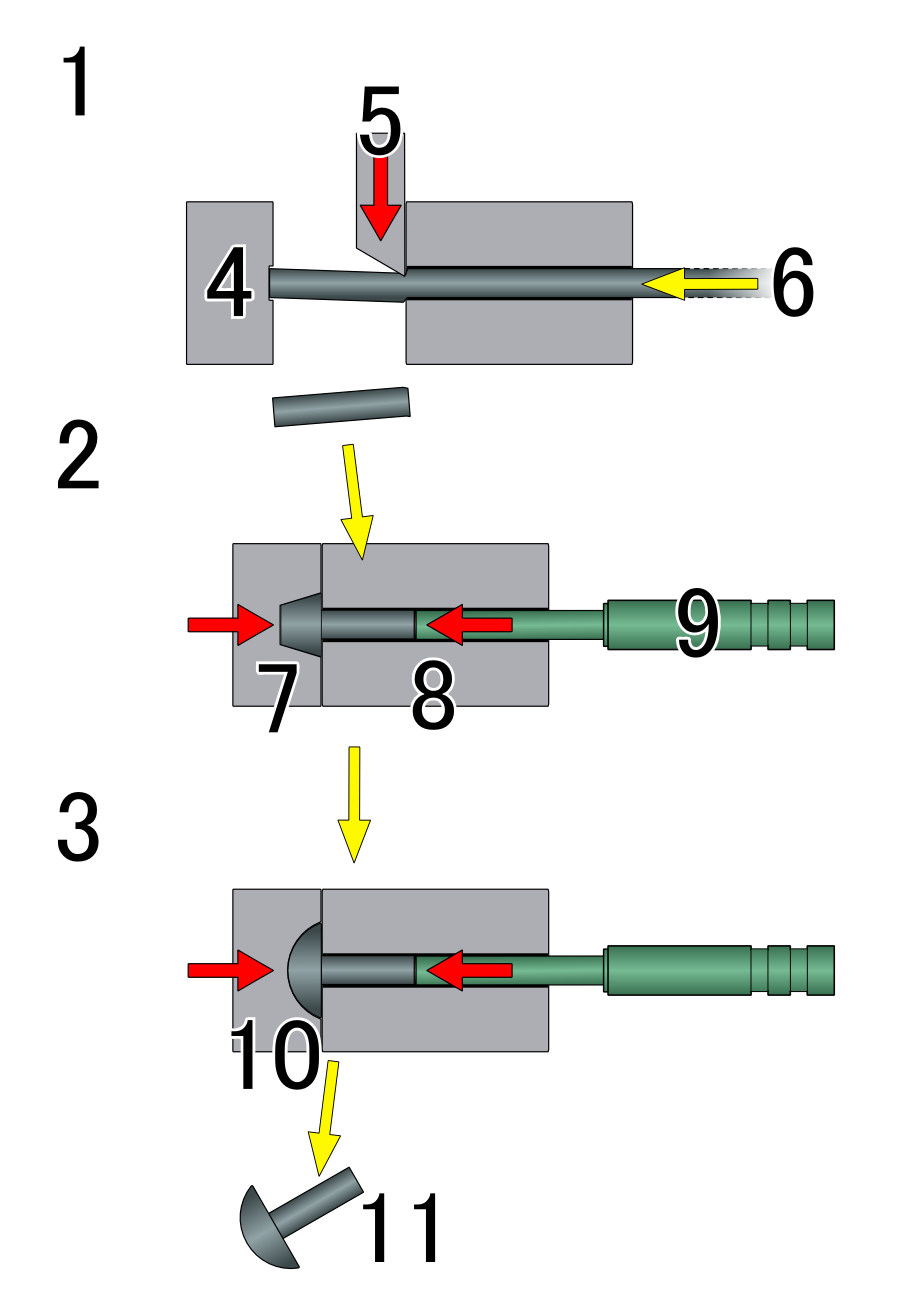

There are three steps in manufacturing a screw: heading, thread rolling, and coating. Screws are normally made from wire, which is supplied in large coils, or round bar stock for larger screws. The wire or rod is then cut to the proper length for the type of screw being made; this workpiece is known as a blank. It is then cold headed, which is a cold working process. Heading produces the head of the screw. The shape of the die in the machine dictates what features are pressed into the screw head; for example a flat head screw uses a flat die. For more complicated shapes two heading processes are required to get all of the features into the screw head. This production method is used because heading has a very high production rate, and produces virtually no waste material. Slotted head screws require an extra step to cut the slot in the head; this is done on a slotting machine. These machines are essentially stripped down milling machines designed to process as many blanks as possible.

The blanks are then polished again prior to threading. The threads are usually produced via thread rolling; however, some are cut. The workpiece is then tumble finished with wood and leather media to do final cleaning and polishing. For most screws, a coating, such as electroplating with zinc (galvanizing) or applying black oxide, is applied to prevent corrosion.

== Types of screws ==
=== Shank ===
Threaded fasteners either have a tapered shank or a non-tapered shank. Fasteners with tapered shanks are designed to either be driven into a substrate directly or into a pilot hole in a substrate, and most are classed as screws. Mating threads are formed in the substrate as these fasteners are driven in. Fasteners with a non-tapered shank are generally designed to mate with a nut or to be driven into a tapped hole, and most would be classed as bolts, although some are thread-forming (eg. taptite) and some authorities would treat some as screws when they are used with a female threaded fastener other than a nut.

Sheet-metal screws do not have the chip-clearing flute of self-tapping screws. However, some wholesale vendors do not distinguish between the two kinds.

==== Wood screw ====
A wood screw is a metal screw used to fix wood, with a sharp point and a tapered thread designed to cut its own thread into the wood. Some screws are driven into intact wood; larger screws are usually driven into a hole narrower than the screw thread, and cut the thread in the wood. Early wood screws were made by hand, with a series of files, chisels, and other cutting tools, and these can be spotted easily by noting the irregular spacing and shape of the threads, as well as file marks remaining on the head of the screw and in the area between threads. Many of these screws had a blunt end, completely lacking the sharp tapered point on nearly all modern wood screws. Some wood screws were made with cutting dies as early as the late 1700s (possibly even before 1678 when the book content was first published in parts). Eventually, lathes were used to manufacture wood screws, with the earliest patent being recorded in 1760 in England. During the 1850s, swaging tools were developed to provide a more uniform and consistent thread. Screws made with these tools have rounded valleys with sharp and rough threads.

Once screw turning machines were in common use, most commercially available wood screws were produced with this method. These cut wood screws are almost invariably tapered, and even when the tapered shank is not obvious, they can be discerned because the threads do not extend past the diameter of the shank. Such screws are best installed after drilling a pilot hole with a tapered drill bit. The majority of modern wood screws, except for those made of brass, are formed on thread rolling machines. These screws have a constant diameter and threads with a larger diameter than the shank and are stronger because the rolling process does not cut the grain of the metal.

==== Self-tapping screw ====
A self-tapping screw is designed to cut its own thread, usually in a fairly soft metal or plastic, in the same way as a wood screw (wood screws are actually self-tapping, but not referred to as such). Self-tapping screws and also sheet metal screws (tapping screws) may use the same threads, for example according to ISO 1478:1999, designation (ST).

==== Machine screw ====
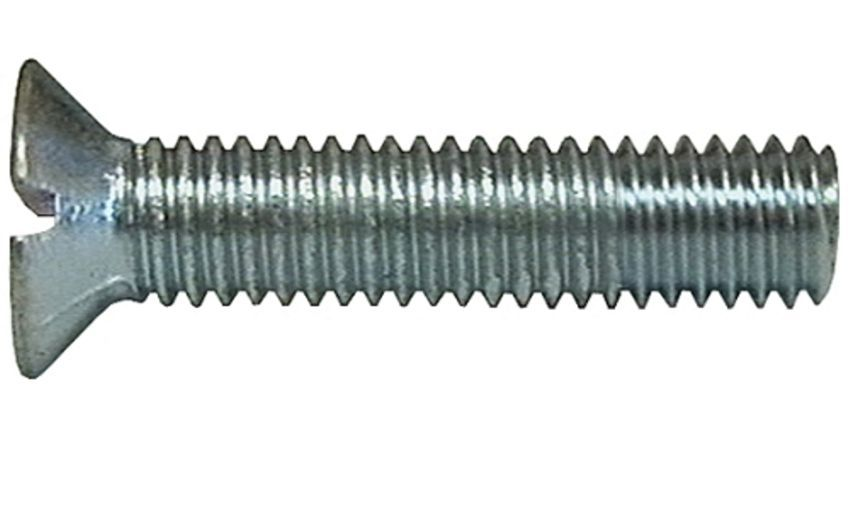
A flat head machine screw

ASME standards specify a variety of machine screws in diameters ranging up to 0.75 in (19.05 mm).

A machine screw is a small fastener less than 1/4 inch (6.35 mm) in diameter similar to a bolt, but which usually has a recessed drive type (slotted, Phillips, etc.) on its head to allow turning it with a screwdriver. Machine screws are threaded the entire length of the shank, and are intended to screw into existing threads in either a nut or a threaded (tapped) hole. Machine screws are also made with socket heads (see above), often referred to as socket-head machine screws.

==== Hex cap screw ====
ASME standard B18.2.1-1996 specifies hex cap screws whose size range is 0.25–3 in (6.35–76.20 mm) in diameter. In 1991, responding to an influx of counterfeit fasteners, Congress passed PL 101-592, the "Fastener Quality Act". As a result, the ASME B18 committee re-wrote B18.2.1, renaming finished hex bolts to hex cap screw – a term that had existed in common usage long before, but was now also being codified as an official name for the ASME B18 standard.

Lug bolt and head bolts are other terms that refer to fasteners that are designed to be threaded into a tapped hole that is in part of the assembly and so based on the Machinery's Handbook distinction they would be screws. Here common terms are at variance with Machinery's Handbook distinction.

==== Lag screw ====
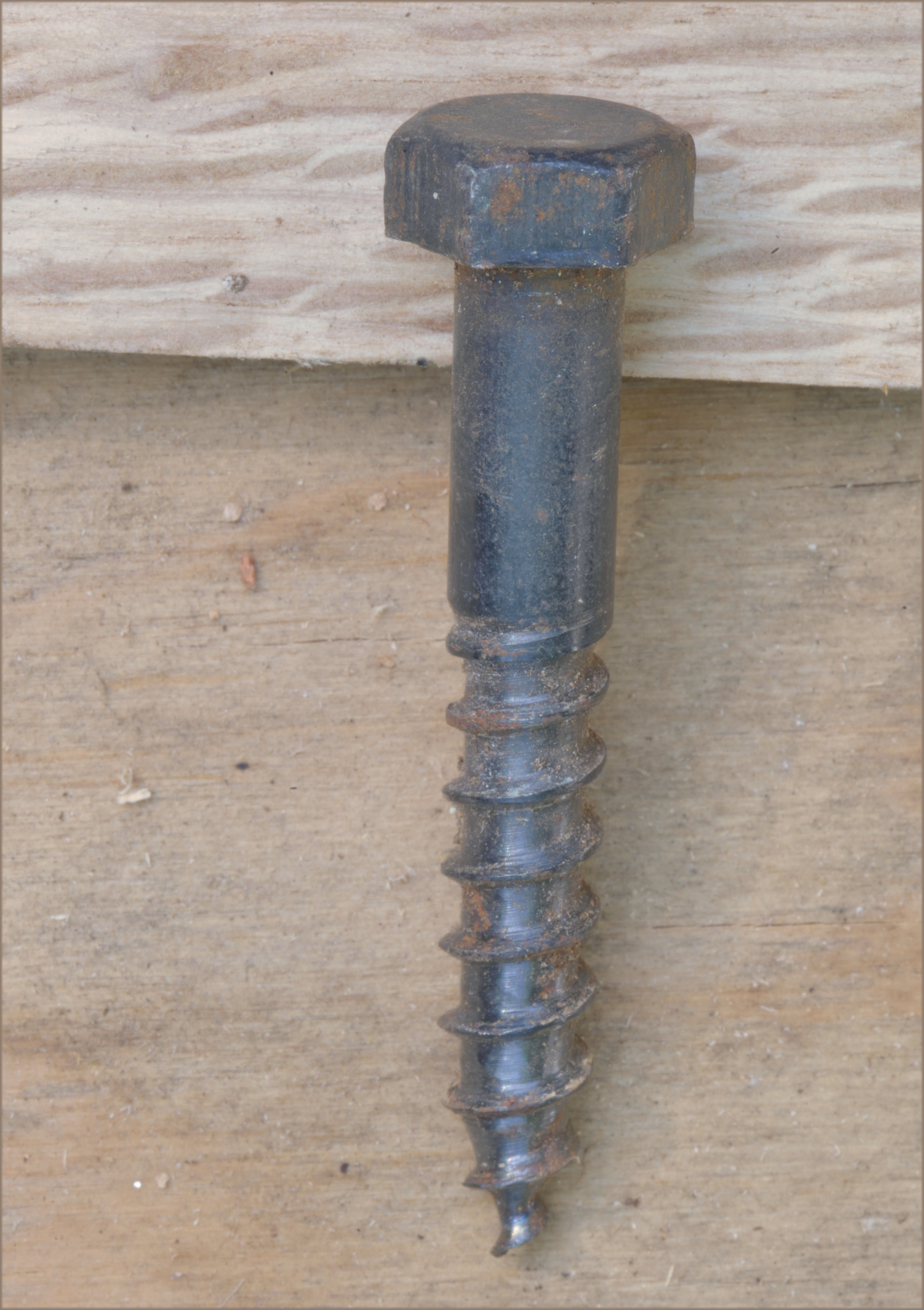
Lag screw, also called a lag bolt

A lag screw (US) or coach screw (UK, Australia, and New Zealand), also called a lag bolt (US and UK) or French wood screw (Scandinavia) is a large wood screw. Lag screws are used to lag together (screw together) wooden framing, to lag machinery feet to wood floors, and for other heavy carpentry applications. The attributive modifier lag came from an early principal use of such fasteners: the fastening of lags such as barrel staves and other similar parts. These fasteners are "screws" according to the Machinery's Handbook criteria, and the obsolescent term "lag bolt" has been replaced by "lag screw" in the Handbook. However, based on tradition many tradesmen continue to refer to them as "bolts", because, like head bolts, they are large, with hex or square heads that require a wrench, socket, or specialized bit to turn.

The head is typically an external hex. Metric hex-headed lag screws are covered by DIN 571. Inch square-headed and hex-headed lag screws are covered by ASME B18.2.1. A typical lag screw can range in diameter from 4 to 20 mm or #10 to 1.25 in (4.83 to 31.75 mm), and lengths from 16 to 200 mm or 1/4 to 6 in (6.35 to 152.40 mm) or longer, with the coarse threads of a wood-screw or sheet-metal-screw threadform (but larger). The materials are usually carbon steel substrate with a coating of zinc galvanization (for corrosion resistance). The zinc coating may be bright yellow (electroplated), or dull gray (hot-dip galvanized).

==== Bone screw ====
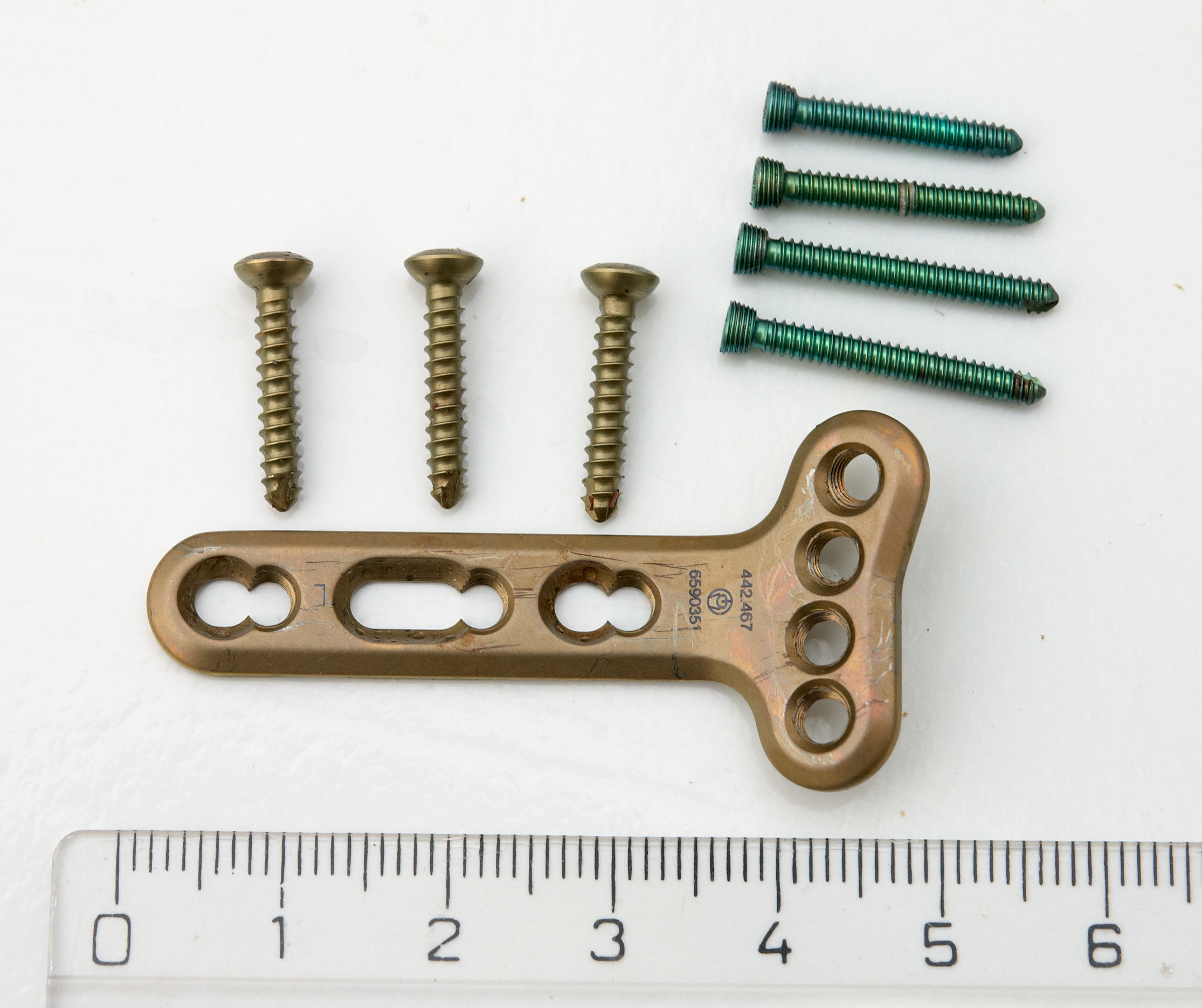
Implant that has been used for fixation of a broken wrist

Bone screws have the medical use of securing broken bones in living humans and animals. As with aerospace and nuclear power, medical use involves some of the highest technology for fasteners; excellent performance, longevity, and quality are required, and reflected in prices. Bone screws are often made of relatively non-reactive stainless steel or titanium, and they often have advanced features such as conical threads, multistart threads, cannulation (hollow core), and proprietary screw drive types, some not seen outside of these applications.

=== Head ===
a — pan b — dome (button) c — round d — truss (mushroom) e — flat (countersunk) f — oval (raised head)

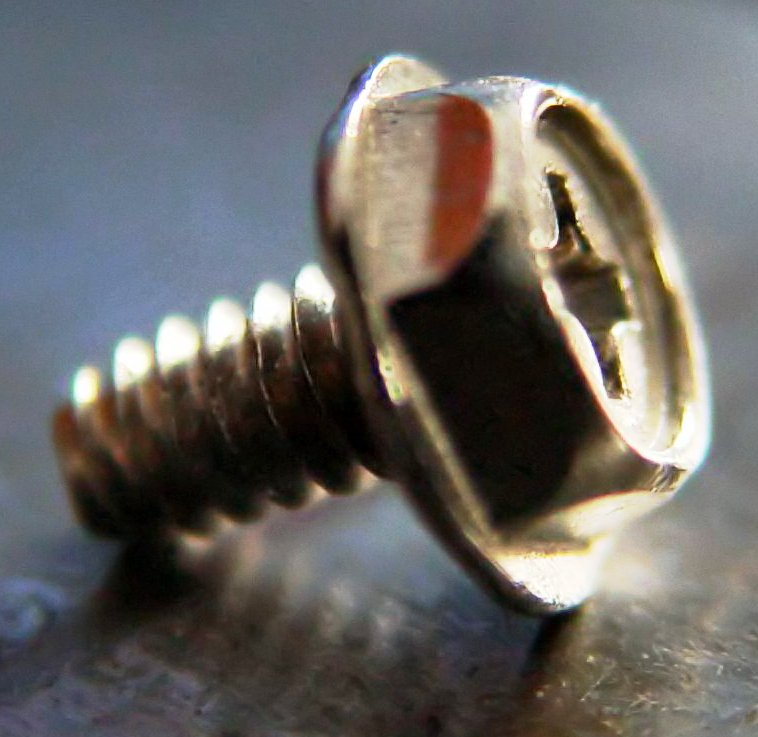
Combination flanged-hex/Phillips-head screw used in computers

There are a variety of screw head shapes. A few varieties of screw are manufactured with a break-away head, which snaps off when adequate torque is applied, to prevent removal after fitting, often to avoid tampering.

Pan head (short for "panel")
A low disc with a rounded, high outer edge with large surface area.
Button or dome head (BH)
Cylindrical with a rounded top.
Round head
A dome-shaped head used for decoration.
Truss head
Lower-profile dome designed to prevent tampering.
Flat head
A screw with a flat head that requires countersinking so that it can be driven with the head flush with the surface it is screwed into. The angle of the screw is measured as the aperture of the cone.
Oval or raised head
A decorative screw head with a countersunk bottom and rounded top. Also known as "raised countersunk" or "instrument head" in the UK.
Bugle head
Similar to countersunk, but there is a smooth progression from the shank to the angle of the head, similar to the bell of a bugle.
Cheese head
Cylindrical.
Fillister head
Cylindrical, but with a slightly convex top surface.
Flanged head
A flanged head can be based on any non-countersunk head style, with the addition of an integrated flange at the base of the head that eliminates the need for a flat washer.
Hex head
Hex shaped, similar to the head of a hex bolt. Sometimes flanged.

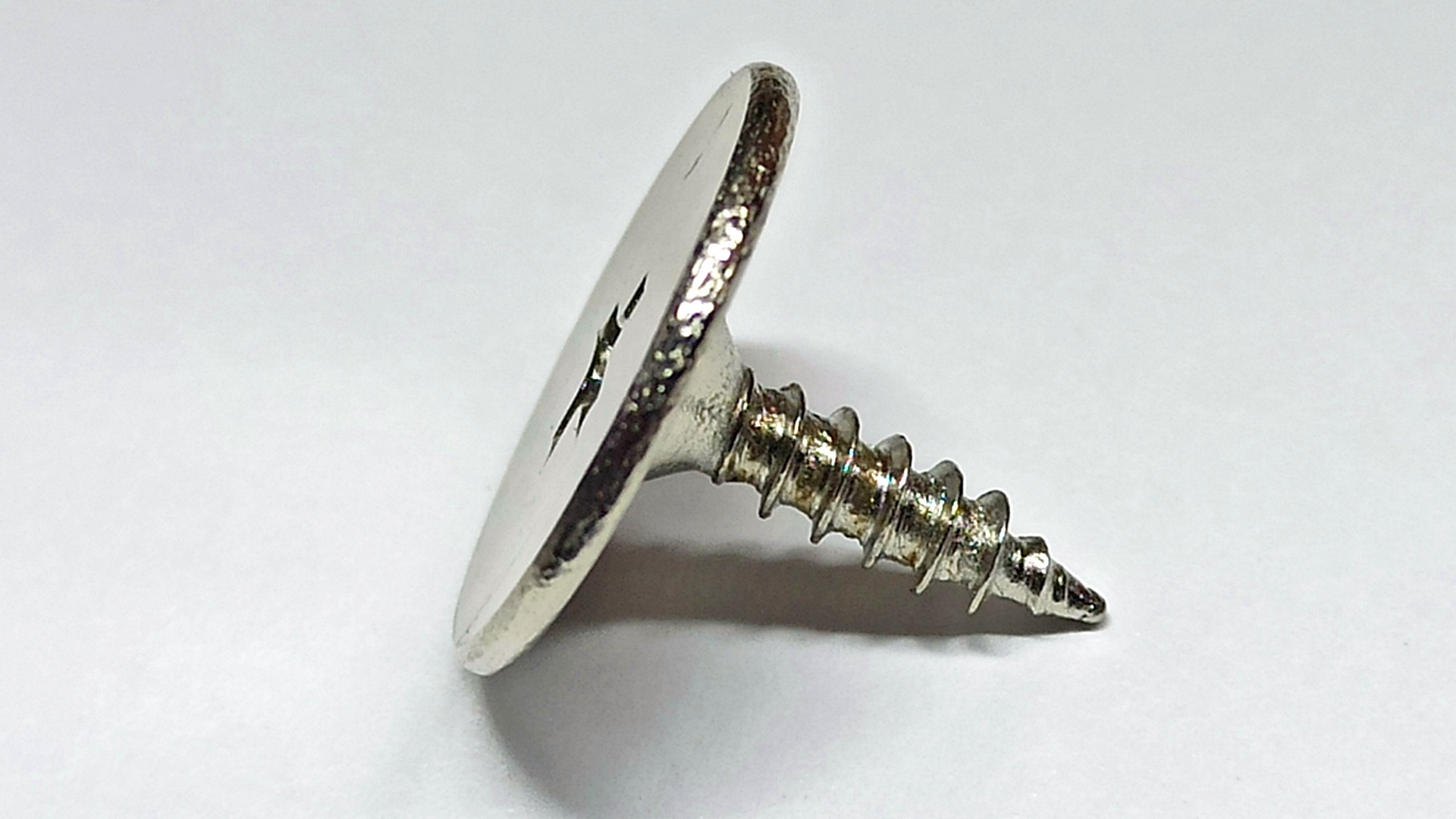
Combo pan and countersunk

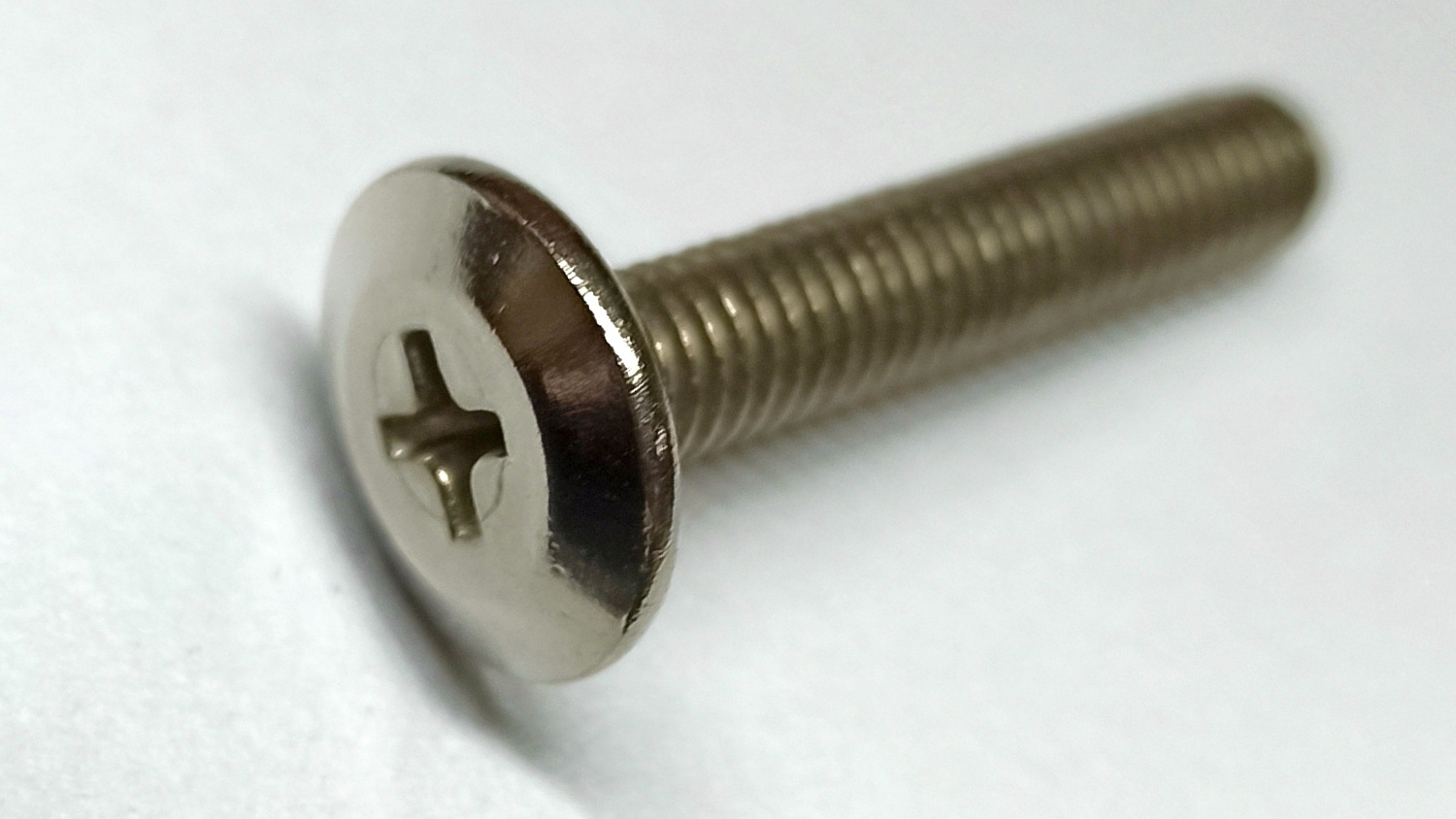
Combo pan and truss

Countersinking
Most head types can provide for countersinking on the underside. This is most relevant to flat heads, which can be driven flush with the surface they are screwed into.

Mixed (combo) head shapes
pan and truss etc.

== Sizes ==
=== Metric ===
The international standards for metric externally threaded fasteners are ISO 898-1 for property classes produced from carbon steels and ISO 3506-1 for property classes produced from corrosion resistant steels.

Head markings and properties for metric hex-head cap screws
Head marking	Grade, material and condition	Nominal size range (mm)	Proof strength		Yield strength, min.		Tensile strength, min.		Core hardness (Rockwell)
Head marking	Grade, material and condition	Nominal size range (mm)	MPa	ksi	MPa	ksi	MPa	ksi	Core hardness (Rockwell)
	Class 3.6	1.6–36	180	26	190	28	330	48	B52–95
	Class 4.6; Low or medium carbon steel	5–100	225	32.6	240	35	400	58	B67–95
	Class 4.8; Low or medium carbon steel; fully or partially annealed	1.6–16	310	45	340	49	420	61	B71–95
	Class 5.8; Low or medium carbon steel; cold worked	5–24	380	55	420	61	520	75	B82–95
	Class 8.8; Medium carbon steel; quench and tempered	Up to 16	580	84	640	93	800	120	
	Class 8.8; Medium carbon steel; quench and tempered	17–72	600	87	660	96	830	120	C23–34
	Class 8.8 low carbon Low carbon boron steel; quench and tempered	17–72	600	87	660	96	830	120	C23–34
	Class 8.8.3; Atmospheric corrosion resistant steel; quench and tempered	17–72	600	87	660	96	830	120	C23–34
	ASTM A325M - Type 1 Medium carbon steel; quench and tempered	12–36	600	87	660	96	830	120	C23–34
	ASTM A325M - Type 3 Atmospheric corrosion resistant steel; quench and tempered	12–36	600	87	660	96	830	120	C23–34
	Class 9.8; Medium carbon steel; quench and tempered	1.6–16	650	94	720	104	900	130	C27–36
	Class 9.8 low carbon Low carbon boron steel; quench and tempered	1.6–16	650	94	720	104	900	130	C27–36
	Class 10.9; Alloy steel; quench and tempered	5–100	830	120	940	136	1,040	151	C33–39
	Class 10.9 low carbon Low carbon boron steel; quench and tempered	5–100	830	120	940	136	1,040	151	C33–39
	Class 10.9.3; Atmospheric corrosion resistant steel; quench and tempered	5–100	830	120	940	136	1,040	151	C33–39
	ASTM A490M - Type 1 Alloy steel; quench and tempered	12–36	830	120	940	136	1,040	151	C33–39
	ASTM A490M - Type 3 Atmospheric corrosion resistant steel; quench and tempered	12–36	830	120	940	136	1,040	151	C33–39
	Class 12.9; Alloy steel; quench and tempered	1.6–100	970	141	1,100	160	1,220	177	C38–44
	A2; Stainless steel with 17–19% chromium and 8–13% nickel	up to 20			210 minimum 450 typical	30 minimum 65 typical	500 minimum 700 typical	73 minimum 100 typical	
	ISO 3506-1 A2-50; 304 stainless steel-class 50 (annealed)				210	30	500	73	
	ISO 3506-1 A2-70; 304 stainless steel-class 70 (cold worked)				450	65	700	100	
	ISO 3506-1 A2-80; 304 stainless steel-class 80				600	87	800	120	

=== Inch ===
There are many standards governing the material and mechanical properties of imperial sized externally threaded fasteners. Some of the most common consensus standards for grades produced from carbon steels are ASTM A193, ASTM A307, ASTM A354, ASTM F3125, and SAE J429. Some of the most common consensus standards for grades produced from corrosion resistant steels are ASTM F593 & ASTM A193.

Head markings and properties for inch-system hex-head cap screws
Head marking	Grade, material and condition	Nominal size range (in)	Proof strength		Yield strength, min.		Tensile strength, min.		Core hardness (Rockwell)
Head marking	Grade, material and condition	Nominal size range (in)	ksi	MPa	ksi	MPa	ksi	MPa	Core hardness (Rockwell)
	SAE Grade 0	Strength and hardness is not specified							
	SAE grade 1 ASTM A307; Low carbon steel	1/4–1 1/2	33	230			60	410	B70–100
	ASTM A307 - Grade B Low or medium carbon steel	1/4–4					60 minimum 100 maximum	410 minimum 690 maximum	B69–95
	SAE grade 2 Low or medium carbon steel	1/4–3/4	55	380	57	390	74	510	B80–100
	SAE grade 2 Low or medium carbon steel	Greater than 3/4	33	230	36	250	60	410	B70–100
	SAE grade 4 Medium carbon steel; cold worked	1/4–1 1/2			100	690	115	790	
	SAE grade 3 Medium carbon steel; cold worked	1/4–1	85	590			100	690	B70–100
	SAE grade 5 Medium carbon steel; quench and tempered	1/4–1 (inc.)	85	590	92	630	120	830	C25–34
	SAE grade 5 Medium carbon steel; quench and tempered	1–1 1/2	74	510	81	560	105	720	C19–30
	ASTM A449 - Type 1 Medium carbon steel; quench and tempered	1–1 1/2 (inc.)	74	510			105	720	C19–30
	ASTM A449 - Type 1 Medium carbon steel; quench and tempered	1 1/2–3	55	380			90	620	Brinell 183–235
	SAE grade 5.1; Low or medium carbon steel; quench and tempered	No. 6–1/2	85	590			120	830	C25–40
	SAE grade 5.2; Low carbon martensitic steel; quench and tempered	1/4–1	85	590			120	830	C26–36
	ASTM A449 - Type 2 Low carbon martensitic steel; quench and tempered	1/4–1	85	590			120	830	C25–34
or	ASTM A325 - Type 1 Medium carbon steel; quench and tempered	1/2–1 (inc.)	85	590	92	630	120	830	C24–35
or	ASTM A325 - Type 1 Medium carbon steel; quench and tempered	1–1 1/2	74	510	82	570	105	720	C19–31
	ASTM A325 - Type 3 Atmospheric corrosion resistant steel; quench and tempered	1/2–1	85	590	92	630	120	830	C24–35
	ASTM A325 - Type 3 Atmospheric corrosion resistant steel; quench and tempered	1–1 1/2	74	510	82	570	105	720	C19–31
	ASTM A354 - Grade BC; Medium carbon alloy steel; quench and tempered	1/4–2 1/2 (inc.)	105	720	109	750	125	860	C26–36
	ASTM A354 - Grade BC; Medium carbon alloy steel; quench and tempered	2 1/2–4	95	660	99	680	115	790	C22–33
	SAE grade 7 Medium carbon alloy steel; quench and tempered	1/4–1 1/2	105	720	115	790	133	920	
	SAE grade 8 Medium carbon alloy steel; quench and tempered	1/4–1 1/2	120	830	130	900	150	1,000	C32–38
	ASTM A354 - Grade BD	1/4–2 1/2 (inc.)	120	830	130	900	150	1,000	C33–39
	ASTM A354 - Grade BD	2 1/2–4	105	720	115	790	140	970	C31–39
	SAE grade 8.2; Medium carbon boron martensitic steel; fully kilned, fine grain, quench and tempered	1/4–1	120	830			150	1,000	C33–39
	ASTM A490 - Type 1 Medium carbon alloy steel; quench and tempered	1/2–1 1/2	120	830	130	900	150 minimum 170 maximum	1,000 minimum 1,200 maximum	C33–38
	ASTM A490 - Type 3 Atmospheric corrosion resistant steel; quench and tempered	1/2–1 1/2	120	830	130	900	150 minimum 170 maximum	1,000 minimum 1,200 maximum	C33–38
	18/8 Stainless; Stainless steel with 17–19% chromium and 8–13% nickel	1/4–5/8 (inc.)			40 minimum 80–90 typical	280 minimum 550–620 typical	100–125 typical	690–860 typical	
	18/8 Stainless; Stainless steel with 17–19% chromium and 8–13% nickel	5/8–1 (inc.)			40 minimum 45–70 typical	280 minimum 310–480 typical	100 typical	690 typical	
	18/8 Stainless; Stainless steel with 17–19% chromium and 8–13% nickel	over 1			40 minimum 45–70 typical	280 minimum 310–480 typical	80–90 typical	550–620 typical	

== Tools ==
An electric driver screws a self-tapping Phillips head screw into wood

The hand tool used to drive in most screws is called a screwdriver. A power tool that does the same job is a power screwdriver; power drills may also be used with screw-driving attachments. Where the holding power of the screwed joint is critical, torque-measuring and torque-limiting screwdrivers are used to ensure sufficient but not excessive force is developed by the screw. The hand tool for driving hex head threaded fasteners is a spanner (UK usage) or wrench (US usage), while a nut setter is used with a power screw driver.

Modern screws employ a wide variety of screw drive designs, each requiring a different kind of tool to drive in or extract them. The most common screw drives are the slotted and Phillips in the US; hex, Robertson, and Torx are also common in some applications. Some types of drive are intended for automatic assembly in mass-production of such items as automobiles. More exotic screw drive types may be used in situations where tampering is undesirable, such as in electronic appliances that should not be serviced by the user.

== Screw threads ==
There are many systems for specifying the dimensions of screws, but in much of the world the ISO metric screw thread preferred series has displaced the many older systems. Other relatively common systems include the British Standard Whitworth, BA system (British Association), and the Unified Thread Standard.

=== ISO metric screw thread ===
The basic principles of the ISO metric screw thread are defined in international standard ISO 68-1 and preferred combinations of diameter and pitch are listed in ISO 261. The smaller subset of diameter and pitch combinations commonly used in screws, nuts and bolts is given in ISO 262. The most commonly used pitch value for each diameter is the coarse pitch. For some diameters, one or two additional fine pitch variants are also specified, for special applications such as threads in thin-walled pipes. ISO metric screw threads are designated by the letter M followed by the major diameter of the thread in millimetres (e.g. M8). If the thread does not use the normal coarse pitch (e.g. 1.25 mm in the case of M8), then the pitch in millimeters is also appended with a multiplication sign (e.g. "M8×1" if the screw thread has an outer diameter of 8 mm and advances by 1 mm per 360° rotation).

Metric hexagon bolts, screws and nuts are specified, for example, in International Standards ISO 4014, ISO 4017, and ISO 4032. The following table lists the relationship given in these standards between the thread size and the maximum width across the hexagonal flats (wrench size):

ISO metric thread	M1.6	M2	M2.5	M3	M4	M5	M6	M8	M10	M12	M16	M20	M24	M30	M36	M42	M48	M56	M64
Wrench size (mm)	3.2	4	5	5.5	7	8	10	13	16 or 17	19	24	30	36	46	55	65	75	85	95

In addition, the following non-preferred intermediate sizes are specified:

ISO metric thread	M3.5	M14	M18	M22	M27	M33	M39	M45	M52	M60
Wrench size (mm)	6	21	27	34	41	50	60	70	80	90

Bear in mind that these are just examples and the width across flats is different for structural bolts, flanged bolts, and also varies by standards organization.

=== Whitworth ===
The first person to create a standard (in about 1841) was the English engineer Sir Joseph Whitworth. Whitworth screw sizes are still used, both for repairing old machinery and where a coarser thread than the metric fastener thread is required. Whitworth became British Standard Whitworth, abbreviated to BSW (BS 84:1956) and the British Standard Fine (BSF) thread was introduced in 1908 because the Whitworth thread was too coarse for some applications. The thread angle was 55°, and the depth and pitch varied with the diameter of the thread (i.e., the bigger the bolt, the coarser the thread). Spanners for Whitworth bolts are marked with the size of the bolt, not the distance across the flats of the screw head.

The most common use of a Whitworth pitch nowadays is in all UK scaffolding. Additionally, the standard photographic tripod thread, which for small cameras is 1/4" Whitworth (20 tpi) and for medium/large format cameras is 3/8" Whitworth (16 tpi). It is also used for microphone stands and their appropriate clips, again in both sizes, along with "thread adapters" to allow the smaller size to attach to items requiring the larger thread. Note that while 1/4" UNC bolts fit 1/4" BSW camera tripod bushes, yield strength is reduced by the different thread angles of 60° and 55° respectively.

=== British Association screw thread ===
British Association (BA) screw threads, named after the British Association for Advancement of Science, were devised in 1884 and standardised in 1903. Screws were described as "2BA", "4BA" etc., the odd numbers being rarely used, except in equipment made prior to the 1970s for telephone exchanges in the UK. This equipment made extensive use of odd-numbered BA screws, in order—it may be suspected—to reduce theft. BA threads are specified by British Standard BS 93:1951 "Specification for British Association (B.A.) screw threads with tolerances for sizes 0 B.A. to 16 B.A."

While not related to ISO metric screws, the sizes were actually defined in metric terms, a 0BA thread having a 6 mm diameter and 1 mm pitch. Other threads in the BA series are related to 0BA in a geometric series with the common factors 0.9 and 1.2. For example, a 4BA thread has pitch $\scriptstyle p=0.9^4$ mm (0.65 mm) and diameter $\scriptstyle 6p^{1.2}$ mm (3.62 mm). Although 0BA has the same diameter and pitch as ISO M6, the threads have different forms and are not compatible.

BA threads are still common in some niche applications. Certain types of fine machinery, such as moving-coil meters and clocks, tend to have BA threads wherever they are manufactured. BA sizes were also used extensively in aircraft, especially those manufactured in the United Kingdom. BA sizing is still used in railway signalling, mainly for the termination of electrical equipment and cabling.

BA threads are extensively used in Model Engineering where the smaller hex head sizes make scale fastenings easier to represent. As a result, many UK Model Engineering suppliers still carry stocks of BA fasteners up to typically 8BA and 10BA. 5BA is also commonly used as it can be threaded onto 1/8 rod.

=== Unified Thread Standard ===
The Unified Thread Standard (UTS) is most commonly used in the United States, but is also extensively used in Canada and occasionally in other countries. The size of a UTS screw is described using the following format: X-Y, where X is the nominal size (the hole or slot size in standard manufacturing practice through which the shank of the screw can easily be pushed) and Y is the threads per inch (TPI). For sizes 1/4 inch and larger the size is given as a fraction; for sizes less than this an integer is used, ranging from 0 to 16. The integer sizes can be converted to the actual diameter by using the formula 0.060 + (0.013 × number). For example, a #4 screw is 0.060 + (0.013 × 4) = 0.060 + 0.052 = 0.112 inches in diameter. There are also screw sizes smaller than "0" (zero or ought). The sizes are 00, 000, 0000 which are usually referred to as two ought, three ought, and four ought. Most eyeglasses have the bows screwed to the frame with 00-72 (pronounced double ought – seventy two) size screws. To calculate the major diameter of "ought" size screws count the number of 0's and multiply this number by 0.013 and subtract from 0.060. For example, the major diameter of a 000-72 screw thread is .060 – (3 x .013) = 0.060 − 0.039 = .021 inches. For most size screws there are multiple TPI available, with the most common being designated a Unified Coarse Thread (UNC or UN) and Unified Fine Thread (UNF or UF). It is estimated that approximately 60% of screw threads in use in the United States are inch based.

== Mechanical classifications ==
The numbers stamped on the head of the bolt are referred to as the "grade" of the bolt used in certain applications considering the strength of a bolt. High-strength steel bolts usually have a hexagonal head with an ISO strength rating (called property class) stamped on the head. And the absence of marking/number indicates a lower grade bolt with low strength. The property classes most often used are 5.8, 8.8, and 10.9. The number before the point is the ultimate tensile strength in MPa divided by 100. The number after the point is the multiplier ratio of yield strength to ultimate tensile strength. For example, a property class 5.8 bolt has a nominal (minimum) ultimate tensile strength of 500 MPa, and a tensile yield strength of 0.8 times ultimate tensile strength or 0.8 (500) = 400 MPa.

Ultimate tensile strength is the tensile stress at which the bolt fails. Tensile yield strength is the stress at which the bolt will yield in tension across the entire section of the bolt and receive a permanent set (an elongation from which it will not recover when the force is removed) of 0.2% offset strain. Proof strength is the usable strength of the fastener. Tension testing of a bolt up to the proof load should not cause permanent set of the bolt and should be conducted on actual fasteners rather than calculated. If a bolt is tensioned beyond the proof load, it may behave in plastic manner due to yielding in the threads and the tension preload may be lost due to the permanent plastic deformations. When elongating a fastener prior to reaching the yield point, the fastener is said to be operating in the elastic region; whereas elongation beyond the yield point is referred to as operating in the plastic region of the bolt material. If a bolt is loaded in tension beyond its proof strength, the yielding at the net root section of the bolt will continue until the entire section begins to yield and it has exceeded its yield strength. If tension increases, the bolt fractures at its ultimate strength.

Mild steel bolts have property class 4.6, which is 400 MPa ultimate strength and 0.6*400=240 MPa yield strength. High-strength steel bolts have property class 8.8, which is 800 MPa ultimate strength and 0.8*800=640 MPa yield strength or above.

The same type of screw or bolt can be made in many different grades of material. For critical high-tensile-strength applications, low-grade bolts may fail, resulting in damage or injury. On SAE-standard bolts, a distinctive pattern of marking is impressed on the heads to allow inspection and validation of the strength of the bolt. However, low-cost counterfeit fasteners may be found with actual strength far less than indicated by the markings. Such inferior fasteners are a danger to life and property when used in aircraft, automobiles, heavy trucks, and similar critical applications.

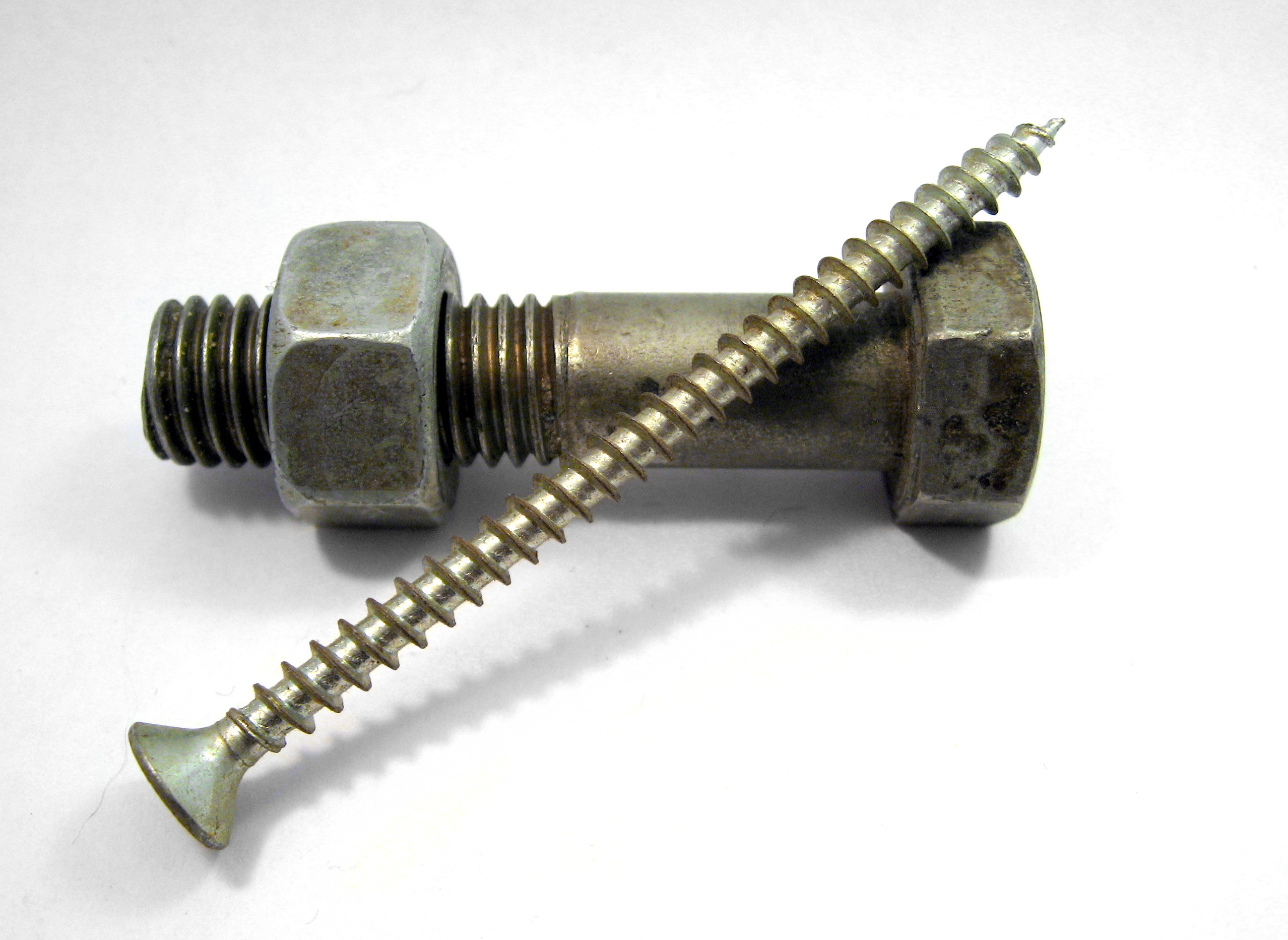
Differentiation between bolt and screw

The Machinery's Handbook describes the distinction between bolts and screws as follows:

A bolt is an externally threaded fastener designed for insertion through holes in assembled parts, and is normally intended to be tightened or released by torquing a nut. A screw is an externally threaded fastener capable of being inserted into holes in assembled parts, of mating with a preformed internal thread or forming its own thread, and of being tightened or released by torquing the head. An externally threaded fastener which is prevented from being turned during assembly and which can be tightened or released only by torquing a nut is a bolt. (Example: round head bolts, track bolts, plow bolts.) An externally threaded fastener that has thread form which prohibits assembly with a nut having a straight thread of multiple pitch length is a screw. (Example: wood screws, tapping screws.)

Old USS and SAE standards defined cap screws as fasteners with shanks that were threaded to the head and bolts as fasteners with shanks that were partially unthreaded. The federal government of the United States made an effort to formalize the difference between a bolt and a screw, because different tariffs apply to each.

== See also ==
- Syndesmotic screw – Type of screw
- Tap and die – Tools to create screw threads
- Threaded rod – Rod with ridges wrapped around it
- Threading (manufacturing) – Process of creating a screw thread
- Wall plug – Insert for screws
