= ASTM A490 =

ASTM A490 and ASTM A490M are ASTM International standards for heavy hex structural bolts made from alloy steel. The imperial standard is officially titled Standard Specification for Structural Bolts, Alloy Steel, Heat Treated, 150 ksi Minimum Tensile Strength, while the metric standard (M) is titled Standard Specification for High-Strength Steel Bolts, Classes 10.9 and 10.9.3, for Structural Steel Joints.

In 2016, specifications A325 and A490 were officially withdrawn by ASTM and replaced by ASTM F3125. A325 and A490 heavy hex structural bolts are now grades under the new F3125 specification.

== Connection types ==
There are also three connection types defined:

- SC: A slip critical connection.
- N: A bearing type connection where the threads are on the shear plane.
- X: A bearing type connection where the threads are not on the shear plane.

== Mechanical properties ==
These bolts are equivalent to ASTM A325 bolts in application and geometry, but are made to a higher strength. The imperial grades are made to the same strength specifications as ASTM A354 grade BD. The metric grades are made to the same strength specifications as ASTM F568M property class 10.9. Also, unlike their weaker counterparts they may not be coated by hot-dip galvanization, mechanical deposition, or electroplating.

Because these bolts are designed to be used in structural applications the threaded length of the bolts are shorter to keep the threads out of the joint.

Imperial head markings and mechanical properties
Grade identification marking	Specification	Nominal size range [in]	Proof strength [ksi]	Yield strength (min) [ksi]	Tensile strength (min) [ksi]	Core hardness [Rockwell]
	ASTM A490 Type 1	1/2–1-1/2	120	130	150 minimum 173 maximum	C33–38
	ASTM A490 Type 2 (withdrawn)	1/2–1	120	130	150 minimum 173 maximum	C33–38
	ASTM A490 Type 3	1/2–1-1/2	120	130	150 minimum 173 maximum	C33–38

Head markings and strengths for metric hex-head cap screws
Grade identification marking	Specification	Nominal size range [mm]	Proof strength [MPa]	Yield strength (min) [MPa]	Tensile strength (min) [MPa]	Core hardness [Rockwell]
	ASTM A490M Type 1	12–36	830	940	1040	C33–39
	ASTM A490M Type 2 (withdrawn)	12–36	830	940	1040	C33–39
	ASTM A490M Type 3	12–36	830	940	1040	C33–39
