= Bolt (fastener) =

Threaded fastener with an external male thread requiring a matching female thread

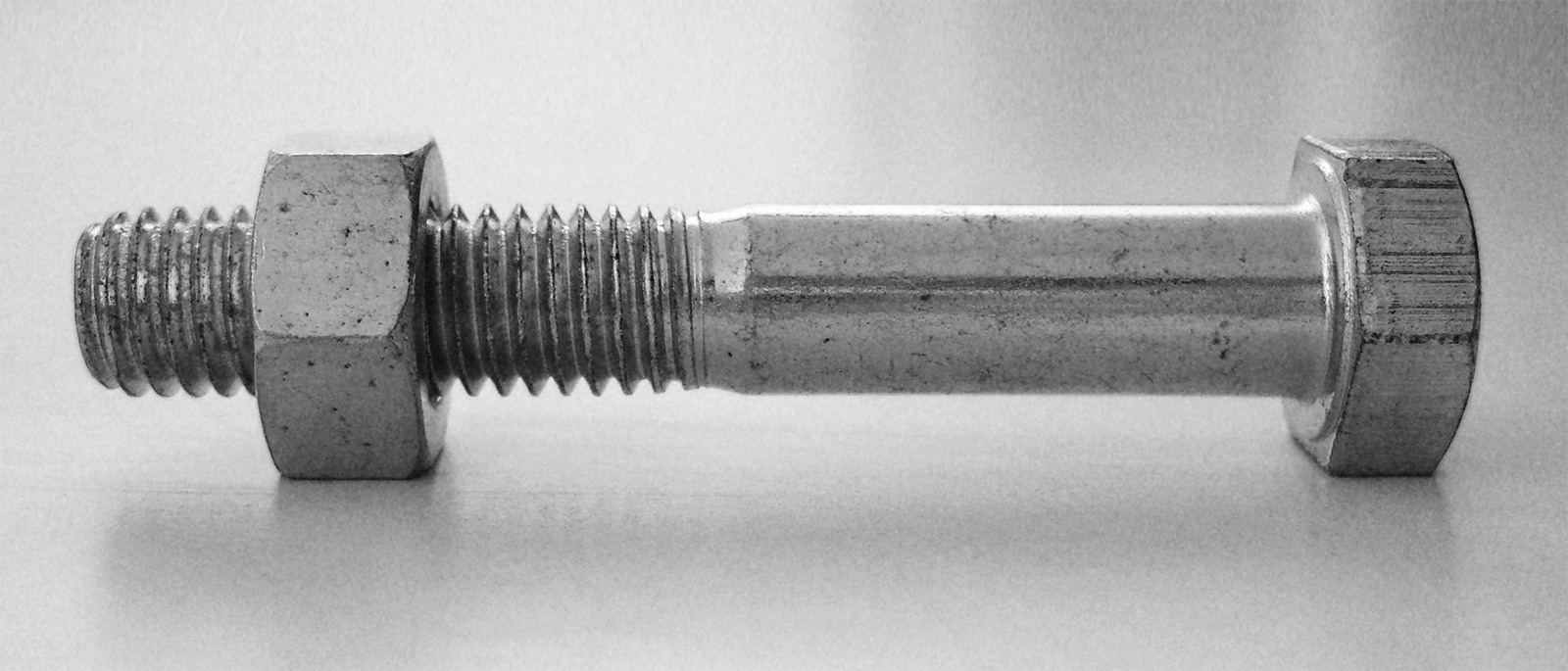
Bolt with a nut

A bolt is an externally helical threaded fastener capable of being tightened or released by a twisting force (torque) to a matching nut. The bolt has an external male thread requiring a matching nut with a preformed female thread.

== History ==
Nuts and bolts were originally hand-crafted together, so that each nut matched its own bolt, but they were not interchangeable. This made it virtually impossible to replace lost or damaged fixers, as they were all different. Joseph Whitworth in 1841 proposed that a standard should be set, but it did not happen immediately.

In 1851 the Great Exhibition of the Works of Industry of All Nations was to be held in Hyde Park, London, England, and it was decided to build the Crystal Palace as part; this had to be done in 190 days, and at reasonable cost. Research into the remains of the destroyed building in 2024 revealed a major innovation that made this possible. The construction firm responsible, Fox Henderson, decided to use nuts and bolts, but to use standardised sizes, a revolutionary method at the time. This enabled the building to be completed in time. The use of interchangeable nuts and bolts was so successful that the Whitworth standard was widely adopted. A British standard was not formally adopted until 1905.

== Bolts vs. screws ==
Bolted joint in vertical section

Screw joint

The distinction between a bolt and a screw is poorly defined. The academic distinction, per Machinery's Handbook, is in their intended purpose: bolts are designed to pass through an unthreaded hole in a component and be fastened with the aid of a nut. Screws in contrast are used in components which contain their own thread, or to cut its own internal thread into them. This definition allows ambiguity in the description of a fastener depending on the application it is actually used for, and the terms screw and bolt are widely used by different people or in different countries to apply to the same or varying fastener. In British terminology, a cap screw is a bolt that has threads all the way to the head.

Bolts are often used to make a bolted joint. This is a combination of the nut applying an axial clamping force and also the shank of the bolt acting as a dowel, pinning the joint against sideways shear forces. For this reason, many bolts have a plain unthreaded shank (called the grip length), as this makes for a better, stronger dowel. The presence of the unthreaded shank has often been given as characteristic of bolts vs. screws, but this is incidental to its use, rather than defining.

Where a fastener forms its own thread in the component being fastened, it is called a screw. This is most obviously so when the thread is tapered (i.e. traditional wood screws), precluding the use of a nut, or when a sheet metal screw or other thread-forming screw is used. A screw must always be turned to assemble the joint. Many bolts are held fixed in place during assembly, either by a tool or by a design of non-rotating bolt, such as a carriage bolt, and only the corresponding nut is turned.

== Bolt heads ==
Bolts use a wide variety of head designs, as do screws. These are designed to engage with the tool used to tighten them. Some bolt heads instead lock the bolt in place, so that it does not move and a tool is only needed for the nut end.

Common bolt heads include hex, slotted hex washer, and socket cap.

The first bolts had square heads, formed by forging. These are still found, although much more common today is the hexagonal head. These are held and turned by a spanner or socket, of which there are many forms. Most are held from the side, some from in-line with the bolt. Other bolts have T-heads and slotted heads.

Many bolts use a screwdriver head fitting, rather than an external wrench. Screwdrivers are applied in-line with the fastener, rather than from the side. These are smaller than most wrench heads and cannot usually apply the same amount of torque. It is sometimes assumed that screwdriver heads imply a screw and wrenches imply a bolt, although this is incorrect. Coach screws, or lag screws, for example, are large square-headed screws with a tapered wood screw thread, used for attaching ironwork to timber. Head designs that overlap both bolts and include the Allen, Torx, hexagonal and splined heads. These modern designs span a large range of sizes and can carry a considerable torque. Threaded fasteners with screwdriver-style heads are often referred to as machine screws whether they are being used with a nut or not.

== Bolt types ==
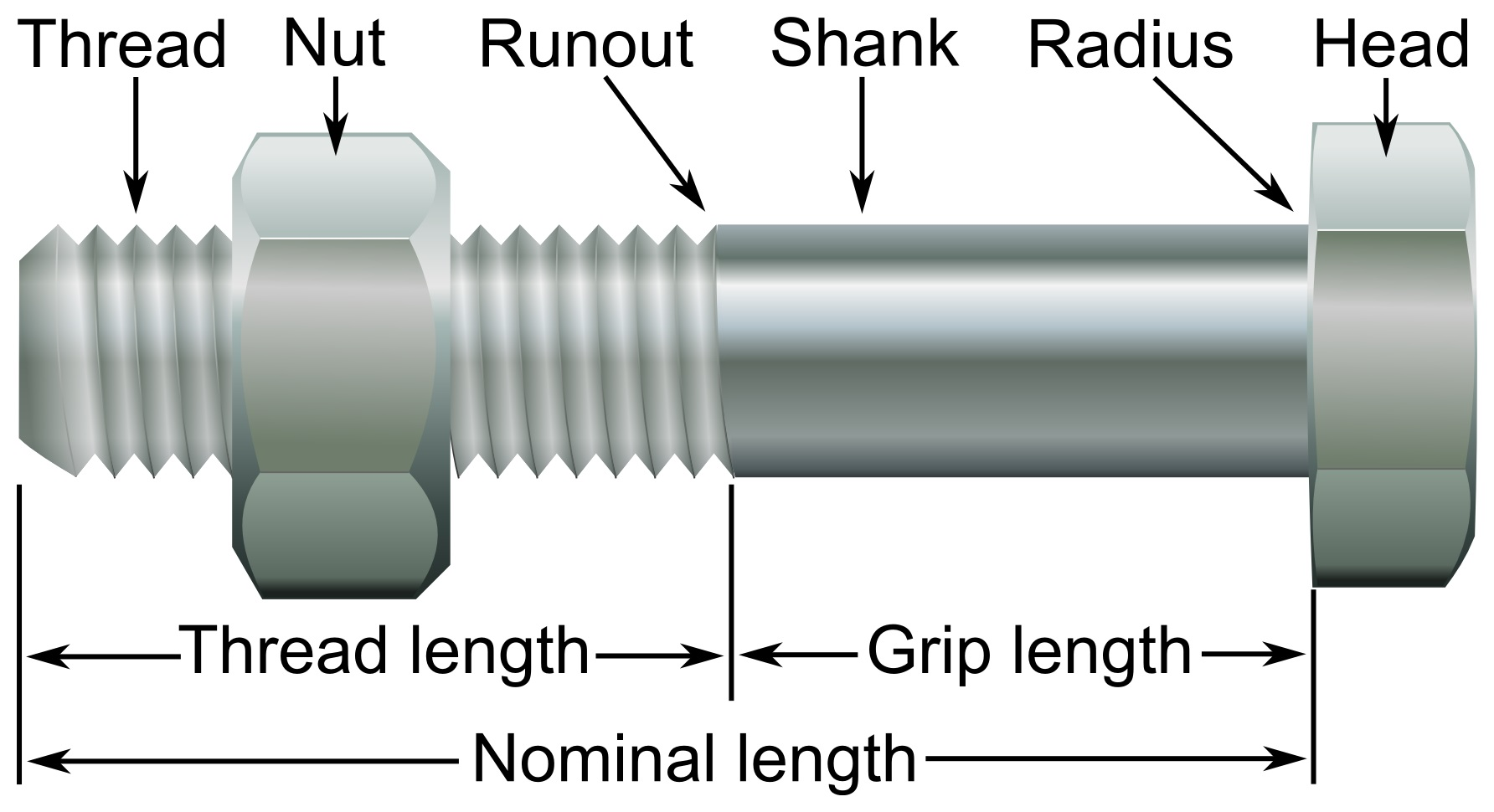
Terminology of a bolt

- Anchor bolt - Bolt designed to allow objects to be attached to concrete. The bolt head is usually placed in concrete before it has cured or placed before the concrete is poured, leaving the threaded end exposed.
- Arbor bolt - Bolt with a washer permanently attached and reversed threading. Designed for use in miter saw and other tools to auto tighten during use to prevent blade fall out.
- Carriage bolt - Bolt with a smooth rounded head and a square section to prevent turning followed with a threaded section for a nut.
- Elevator bolt - Bolt with a large flat head used in conveyor system setups.
- Hanger bolt - Bolt that has no head, machine threaded body followed by a wood threaded screw tip. Allow nuts to be attached to what is really a screw.
- Hex bolt - Bolt with a hexagonal head and threaded shank. Section immediately under head may be unthreaded for fastening thicker materials.
- J bolt - Bolt shaped like the letter J, used for tie downs. Only the straight section is threaded for a nut.
- Rock bolt - Used in tunnel construction to stabilize walls.
- Sex bolt or Chicago bolt - Bolt that has a male and female part with interior threads and bolt heads on either end. Commonly used in paper binding.
- Shoulder bolt or stripper bolt - Bolt with a broad smooth shank and small threaded section at the end used as a pivot pin or attachment point.
- U-bolt - Bolt shaped like the letter U where the two straight sections are threaded. A straight metal plate with two bolt holes is used with nuts to hold pipes or other round objects to the U-bolt.

== Bolt materials ==
Depending on required strength and circumstances, there are several material types can be used for fasteners.

- Steel fasteners (grade 2,5,8) - the level of strength
- Stainless steel fasteners (martensitic stainless steel, austenitic stainless steel),
- Bronze and brass fasteners - water proof usage
- Nylon fasteners - used for the light material and water proof usage.

In general, steel is the most commonly used material of all fasteners: 90% or more.

== Bolted joints ==
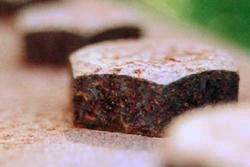
Rusty hexagonal bolt heads

The American Institute of Steel Construction (AISC) 13th Edition Steel Design Manual section 16.1 chapter J-3 specifies the requirements for bolted structural connections. Structural bolts replaced rivets due to the decreasing cost and increasing strength of structural bolts in the 20th century. Connections are formed with two types of joints: slip-critical connections and bearing connections. In slip-critical connections, movement of the connected parts is a serviceability condition and bolts are tightened to a minimum required pre-tension. Slip is prevented through friction of the "faying" surface, that is the plane of shear for the bolt and where two members make contact. Because friction is proportional to the normal force, connections must be sized with bolts numerous and large enough to provide the required load capacity. However, this greatly decreases the shear capacity of each bolt in the connection. The second (and more common type) of connection is a bearing connection. In this type of connection, the bolts carry the load through shear and are only tightened to a "snug-fit". These connections require fewer bolts than slip-critical connections and therefore are a less expensive alternative. Slip-critical connections are more common on flange plates for beam and column splices and moment critical connections. Bearing type connections are used in lightweight structures and in member connections where slip is not important and prevention of structural failure is the design constraint. Common bearing type connections include: shear tabs, beam supports, gusset plates in trusses.

== Spy bolt ==
Modified industrial bolts were used in espionage organizations as hidden containers for clandestine operations. They were used during WW2 by the SOE, OSS, and underground resistance groups. The bolt would be stashed in, for example, a farm gate, and used as a drop box for messages and documents. This consisted of a hollowed out bolt with a reverse threaded screw cap to prevent accidental opening.

== See also ==
- ASTM A325, standard for bolts 1/2 to 1 1/2 inches (12.7 to 38.1 mm) in diameter
- ISO 898, standard for metric bolts
- Mechanical joint
- Screw thread
- Socket wrench
- Thread angle
- Thread-locking compound
- Thread pitch gauge
- Torque wrench
