= ASTM A325 =

ASTM standard

ASTM A325 is an ASTM International standard for heavy hex structural bolts, titled Standard Specification for Structural Bolts, Steel, Heat Treated, 120/105 ksi Minimum Tensile Strength. It defines mechanical properties for bolts that range from 1/2 to 1 1/2 inches (13 to 38 mm) in diameter.

The equivalent metric standard is ASTM A325M, which is titled Standard Specification for Structural Bolts, Steel, Heat Treated 830 MPa Minimum Tensile Strength. It defines mechanical properties for sizes M12–36.

This is a standard set by the standards organization ASTM International, a voluntary standards development organizations that sets technical standards for materials, products, systems, and services.

In 2016, ASTM officially withdrew specification A325 and replaced it with ASTM F3125. To minimize confusion, bolt head markings are unchanged and the designation A325 is retained as a grade name within the new standard. In 1951, A325 bolts were recognized as equivalent to a hot driven ASTM A141 rivet.

== Types ==
The type refers to the type of material used to make the bolt. The standard currently defines two types, however it previously defined the following three:

- Type 1: Medium carbon steel, boron steel, or medium carbon alloy steel
- Type 2: Low carbon martensitic steel (withdrawn from the standard in 1991)
- Type 3: Weathering steel

There is also a T version, which is used to refer to fully threaded bolts.

Note that independent of the material the bolt is quenched and tempered.

== Connection types ==
There are also three connection types defined:

- SC: A slip critical connection.
- N: A bearing type connection where the threads are on the shear plane.
- X: A bearing type connection where the threads are not on the shear plane.

== Mechanical properties ==
=== Mechanical properties, imperial ===
These types of bolts are designed to be tightened to near their proof strength, in order to create significant bolt tension. The standard states that the bolts must be tightened to at least 70% of the tensile yield strength. These bolts use the same material as their common cousins (ASTM F568M for metric bolts), but have a thicker and wider head to more effectively distribute the load. This modified geometry is often referred to as heavy hex geometry. Nuts must meet ASTM A563, which also uses heavy hex geometry. Dimensions of heavy hex geometry are per document ANSI/ASME B18.2.6, which uses "coarse" threads as defined by Unified Thread Standard.

ASTM 325 bolts can be considered equivalent to Grade 8.8 bolts according to ASTM F568M.

For a higher strength version of this type of bolt, see ASTM A490.

Head markings and mechanical properties for imperial sizes
Head marking	Grade	Nominal size range [in]	Proof strength [ksi]	Yield strength (min) [ksi]	Tensile strength (min) [ksi]	Core hardness [Rockwell]
or	Type 1	1/2–1 (inc.)	85	92	120	C24–35
or	Type 1	1–1 1/2	74	81	105	C19–31
74x74пкс	Type 2	1/2–1	85	92	120	C24–35
75x75пкс	Type 3	1/2–1	85	92	120	C24–35
75x75пкс	Type 3	1–1 1/2	74	81	105	C19–31

=== Mechanical properties, metric ===
Head markings and mechanical properties for metric sizes
Head marking	Grade	Nominal size range [mm]	Proof strength [MPa]	Yield strength (min) [MPa]	Tensile strength (min) [MPa]	Core hardness [Rockwell]
	Type 1	12–36	600	660	830	C23–34
	Type 2	12–36	600	660	830	C23–34
	Type 3	12–36	600	660	830	C23–34

/mm

== See also ==
- ASTM F568M
