= Threaded rod =

Rod with ridges wrapped around it

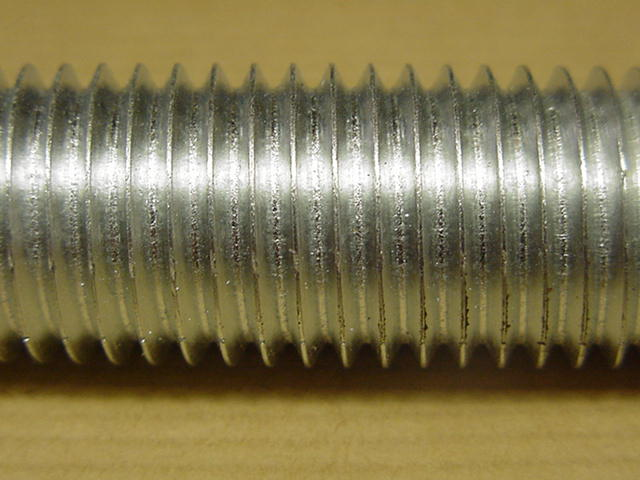
Typical profile of a threaded rod with metric screw threads.

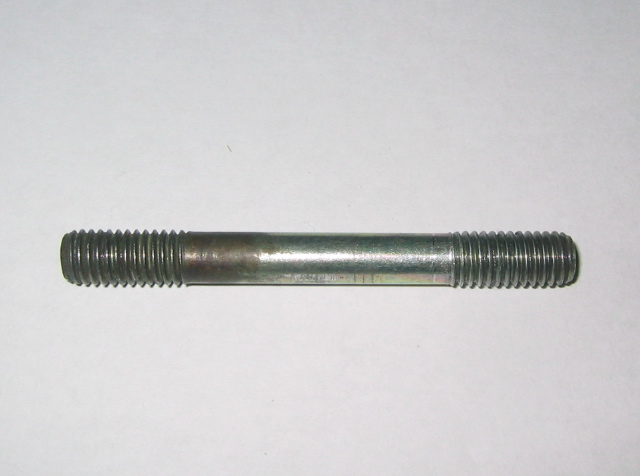
Stud bolt

A threaded rod, also known as a stud, is a relatively long rod that is threaded on both ends; the thread may extend along the complete length of the rod. They are designed to be used in tension. Threaded rod in bar stock form is often called all-thread (ATR); other names include fully-threaded rod, redi-rod, continuously-threaded rod, and TFL rod.

Galvanized steel, mild steel, stainless steel, nylon, brass, copper, aluminum, and titanium are all commonly used to make threaded rods.

== Studs ==
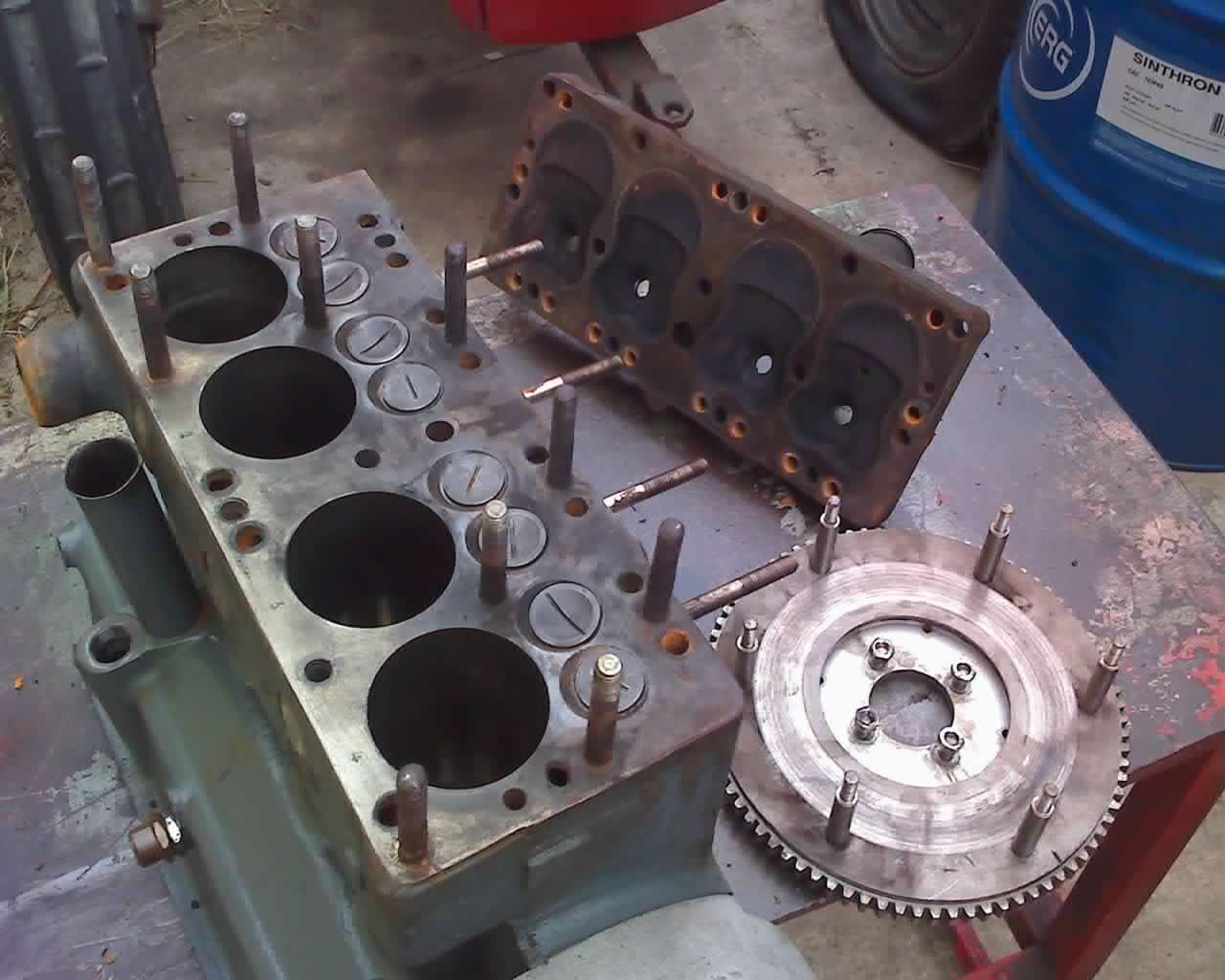
Fiat Balilla engine with cylinder head removed, showing the studs that normally hold it in place

Studs may have a drive slot in one end to facilitate installing the stud.

=== Types ===
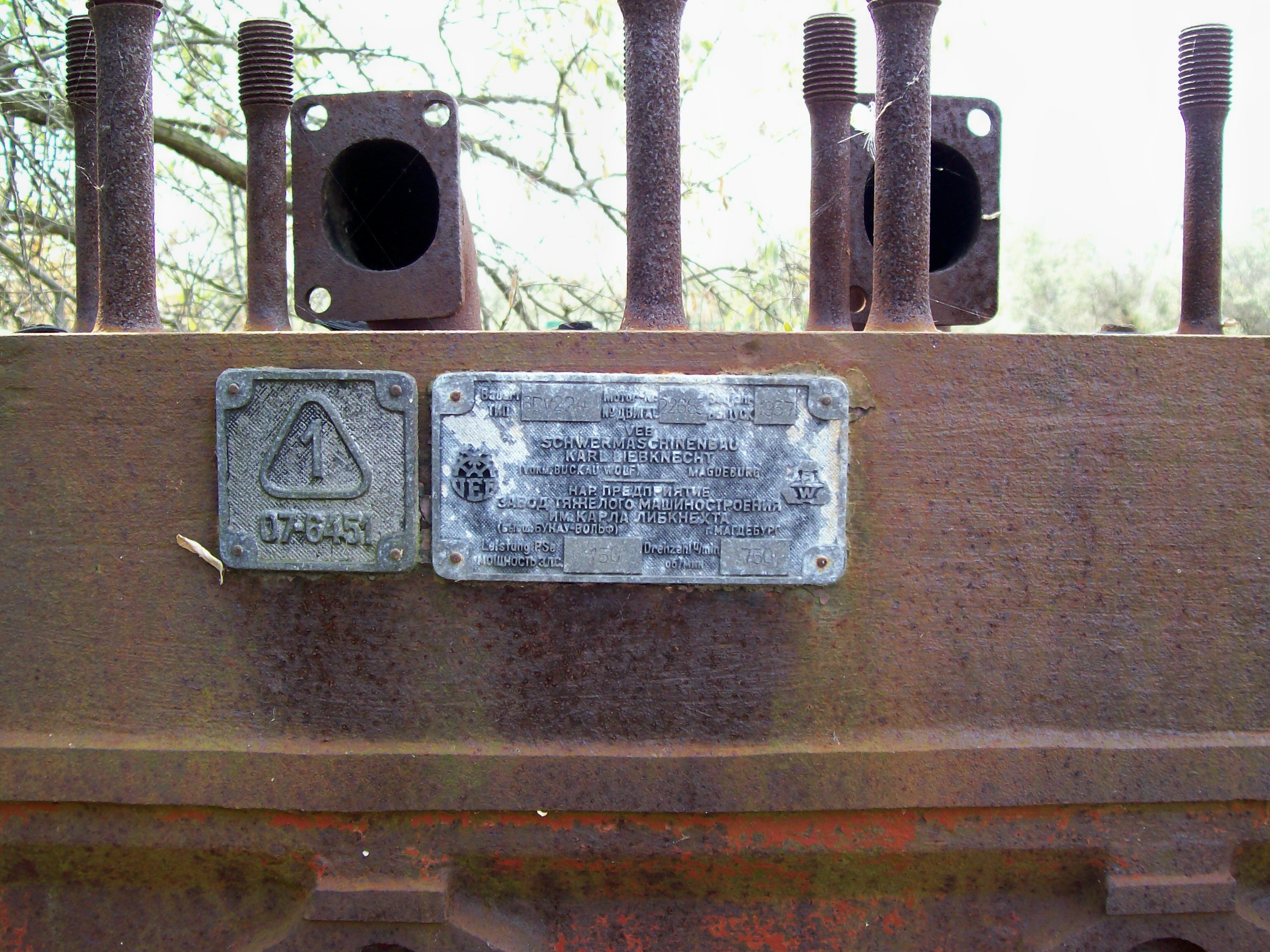
"Waisted" or "undercut" studs, as engine cylinder head retainers

With respect to shape, stud bolts a.k.a. studs are categorized into three basic types: "fully threaded stud bolts", "tap-end stud bolts", and "double-end stud bolts". Each of these studs have different application. As name suggests, fully threaded studs have full body coverage with threads for full engagement of the matings nuts or similar parts. Tap-end studs have threads at extreme ends of the body with unequal thread engagement length, while double-end stud bolts have equal thread length at both ends. Apart from these, there are stud bolts for flanges, which are fully threaded studs with chamfered ends, and double-end studs with reduced shank for special bolting applications.

For studs that are not completely threaded, there are two types of studs: full-bodied studs, and undercut studs. Full-bodied studs have a shank equal to the major diameter of the thread. Undercut studs have a shank equal to the pitch diameter of the screw thread. Undercut studs are designed to better distribute axial stresses. In a full-bodied stud the stresses are greater in the threads than in the shank.

Undercut studs (rolled thread) are also stronger because the metal is "rolled" up to the major diameter, not removed. This preserves the grain of the steel, and in some cases even enhances it. Full-bodied studs (cut thread) are weaker because metal is removed to create the thread, disturbing the grain of the steel.

Undercut studs are only required in applications where the stud is exposed to fatigue. Cut threads are entirely suitable for many applications, even when rolled threads might be slightly stronger. Mass-produced fasteners (standard bolts and studs) are usually rolled, but jobbed parts with custom features and small lot sizes are likely to be cut.

== Strength ==
The allowable tensile force for a non-undercut threaded rod is defined by the American Institute of Steel Construction (AISC) as

$$P = \frac{0.33 F_\text{u} \pi d^2}{4},$$

where d is the nominal diameter, and F_{u} is the ultimate tensile strength of the material. For undercut threaded rods the allowable tensile stress is defined as

$$P = \frac{0.6 F_\text{y} \pi d_\text{s}^2}{4},$$

where d_{s} is the diameter of the shank, and F_{y} is the yield strength of the material.

Both equations give units of force for the result, i.e. pounds-force or newtons.

== Class ==
Metric threaded rods are marked on the end with a color code to define the ISO strength class. The color codes are:

- Unmarked — 4.6 class (tensile strength = 400 N/mm^{2}, yield strength 240 N/mm^{2})
- Yellow — 8.8 class (800 N/mm^{2}, 640 N/mm^{2})
- Green — A2 stainless steel (304)
- Red — A4 stainless steel (316)
- White — 10.9 class (1000 N/mm^{2}, 900 N/mm^{2})

== Bibliography ==
- Oberg, Erik; Jones, Franklin D.; Horton, Holbrook L.; Ryffel, Henry H. (1996), Green, Robert E.; McCauley, Christopher J. (eds.), Machinery's Handbook (25th ed.), New York: Industrial Press, ISBN 978-0-8311-2575-2, OCLC 473691581.
