= Radio-controlled model =

Scale model steered using radio control

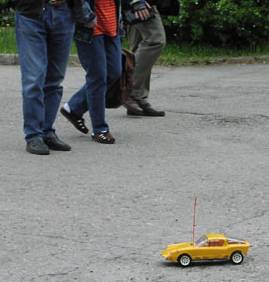
1:10 scale radio-controlled car (Saab Sonett II)

A radio-controlled model (or RC model) is a model that is steerable with the use of radio control (RC). All types of model vehicles have had RC systems installed in them, including ground vehicles, boats, planes, helicopters and even submarines and scale railway locomotives.

== History ==
World War II saw increased development in radio control technology. The Luftwaffe used controllable winged bombs for targeting Allied ships. During the 1930s the Good brothers Bill and Walt pioneered vacuum tube based control units for RC hobby use. Their "Guff" radio controlled plane is on display at the National Aerospace museum. Ed Lorenze published a design in Model Airplane News that was built by many hobbyists. Later, after WW2, in the late 1940s to mid 1950 many other RC designs emerged and some were sold commercially, Berkeley's Super Aerotrol, was one such example. Superregenerative receivers were used to keep the size and power consuption low.

Originally simple 'on-off' systems, these evolved to use complex systems of relays to control a rubber powered escapement's speed and direction. In another more sophisticated version developed by the Good brothers called TTPW, information was encoded by varying the signal's mark/space ratio (pulse proportional). Commercial versions of these systems quickly became available. The tuned reed system brought new sophistication, using metal reeds to resonate with the transmitted signal and operate one of a number of different relays. In the 1960s the availability of transistor-based equipment led to the rapid development of fully proportional servo-based "digital proportional" systems, achieved initially with discrete components, again driven largely by amateurs but resulting in commercial products. In the 1970s, integrated circuits made the electronics small, light and cheap enough for the 1960s-established multi-channel digital proportional systems to become much more widely available.

In the 1990s miniaturised equipment became widely available, allowing radio control of the smallest models, and by the 2000s radio control was commonplace even for the control of inexpensive toys. At the same time the ingenuity of modellers has been sustained and the achievements of amateur modelers using new technologies has extended to such applications as gas-turbine powered aircraft, aerobatic helicopters and submarines.

Before radio control, many models would use simple burning fuses or clockwork mechanisms to control flight or sailing times. Sometimes clockwork controllers would also control and vary direction or behaviour. Other methods included tethering to a central point (popular for model cars and hydroplanes), round the pole control for electric model aircraft and control lines (called u-control in the US) for internal combustion powered aircraft.

The first general use of radio control systems in models started in the late 1940s with single-channel self-built equipment; commercial equipment came soon thereafter. Initially remote control systems used escapement, (often rubber driven) mechanical actuation in the model. Commercial sets often used ground standing transmitters, long whip antennas with separate ground poles and single vacuum tube receivers. The first kits had dual tubes for more selectivity. Such early systems were invariably super regenerative circuits, which meant that two controllers used in close proximity would interfere with one another. The requirement for heavy batteries to drive tubes also meant that model boat systems were more successful than model aircraft.

The advent of transistors greatly reduced the battery requirements, since the current requirements at low voltage were greatly reduced and the high voltage battery was eliminated. Low cost systems employed a superregenerative transistor receiver sensitive to a specific audio tone modulation, the latter greatly reducing interference from 27 MHz Citizens' band radio communications on nearby frequencies. Use of an output transistor further increased reliability by eliminating the sensitive output relay, a device subject to both motor-induced vibration and stray dust contamination.

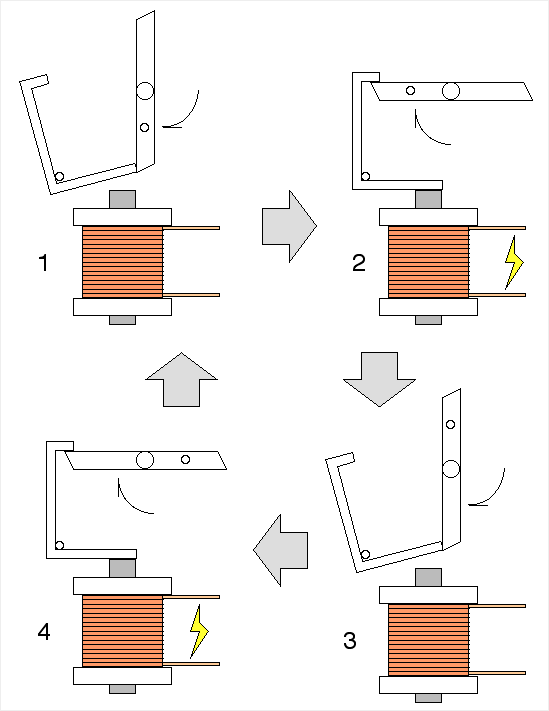
Click image for explanation of radio escapement operation

In both tube and early transistor sets the model's control surfaces were usually operated by an electromagnetic escapement controlling the stored energy in a rubber-band loop, allowing simple rudder control (right, left, and neutral) and sometimes other functions such as motor speed, and kick-up elevator.

In the late 1950s, RC hobbyists had mastered tricks to manage proportional control of the flight control surfaces, for example by rapidly switching on and off reed systems, a technique called "skillful blipping" or more humorously "nervous proportional".

By the early 1960s transistors had replaced the tube and electric motors driving control surfaces were more common. The first low cost "proportional" systems did not use servos, but rather employed a bidirectional motor with a proportional pulse train that consisted of two tones, pulse-width modulated (TTPW). This system, and another commonly known as "Kicking Duck/Galloping Ghost", was driven with a pulse train that caused the rudder and elevator to "wag" though a small angle (not affecting flight owing to small excursions and high speed), with the average position determined by the proportions of the pulse train. A more sophisticated and unique proportional system was developed by Hershel Toomin of Electrosolids corporation called the Space Control. This benchmark system used two tones, pulse width and rate modulated to drive 4 fully proportional servos, and was manufactured and refined by Zel Ritchie, who ultimately gave the technology to the Dunhams of Orbit in 1964. The system was widely imitated, and others (Sampey, ACL, DeeBee) tried their hand at developing what was then known as analog proportional. But these early analog proportional radios were very expensive, putting them out of the reach for most modelers. Eventually, single-channel gave way to multi channel devices (at significantly higher cost) with various audio tones driving electromagnets affecting tuned resonant reeds for channel selection.

Crystal oscillator superheterodyne receivers with better selectivity and stability made control equipment more capable and at lower cost. The constantly diminishing equipment weight was crucial to ever increasing modelling applications. Superheterodyne circuits became more common, enabling several transmitters to operate closely together and enabling further rejection of interference from adjacent Citizen's Band voice radio bands.

Multi-channel developments were of particular use to aircraft which really needed a minimum of three control dimensions (yaw, pitch and motor speed), as opposed to boats which can be controlled with two or one. Radio control 'channels' were originally outputs from a reed array, in other words, a simple on-off switch. To provide a usable control signal a control surface needs to be moved in two directions, so at least two 'channels' would be needed unless a complex mechanical link could be made to provide two-directional movement from a single switch. Several of these complex links were marketed during the 1960s, including the Graupner Kinematic Orbit, Bramco, and Kraft simultaneous reed sets.

Doug Spreng is credited with developing the first "digital" pulse-width feedback servo and along with Don Mathis developed and sold the first digital proportional radio called the "Digicon" followed by Bonner's Digimite, and Hoovers F&M Digital 5.

With the electronics revolution, single-signal channel circuit design became redundant and instead, radios provided coded signal streams which a servomechanism could interpret. Each of these streams replaced two of the original 'channels', and, confusingly, the signal streams began to be called 'channels'. So an old on/off 6-channel transmitter which could drive the rudder, elevator and throttle of an aircraft was replaced with a new proportional 3-channel transmitter doing the same job. Controlling all the primary controls of a powered aircraft (rudder, elevator, ailerons and throttle) was known as 'full-house' control. A glider could be 'full-house' with only three channels.

Soon a competitive marketplace emerged, bringing rapid development. By the 1970s the trend for 'full-house' proportional radio control was fully established. Typical radio control systems for radio-controlled models employ pulse-width modulation (PWM), pulse-position modulation (PPM) and more recently spread spectrum technology, and actuate the various control surfaces using servomechanisms. These systems made 'proportional control' possible, where the position of the control surface in the model is proportional to the position of the control stick on the transmitter.

PWM is most commonly used in radio control equipment today, where transmitter controls change the width (duration) of the pulse for that channel between 920 μs and 2120 μs, 1520 μs being the center (neutral) position. The pulse is repeated in a frame of between 10 and 30 milliseconds in length. Off-the-shelf servos respond directly to servo control pulse trains of this type using integrated decoder circuits, and in response they actuate a rotating arm or lever on the top of the servo. An electric motor and reduction gearbox is used to drive the output arm and a variable component such as a resistor "potentiometer" or tuning capacitor. The variable capacitor or resistor produces an error signal voltage proportional to the output position which is then compared with the position commanded by the input pulse and the motor is driven until a match is obtained. The pulse trains representing the whole set of channels is easily decoded into separate channels at the receiver using very simple circuits such as a Johnson counter. The relative simplicity of this system allows receivers to be small and light, and has been widely used since the early 1970s. Usually a single-chip 4017 decade counter is used inside the receiver to decode the transmitted multiplexed PPM signal to the individual "RC PWM" signals sent to each RC servo. Often a Signetics NE544 IC or a functionally equivalent chip is used inside the housing of low-cost RC servos as the motor controller—it decodes that servo control pulse train to a position, and drives the motor to that position.

More recently, high-end hobby systems using Pulse-Code Modulation (PCM) features have come on the market that provide a digital bit-stream signal to the receiving device instead of analog type pulse modulation. Advantages include bit error checking capabilities of the data stream (good for signal integrity checking) and fail-safe options including motor (if the model has a motor) throttle down and similar automatic actions based on signal loss. However, those systems that use pulse code modulation generally induce more lag due to lesser frames sent per second as bandwidth is needed for error checking bits. PCM devices can only detect errors and thus hold the last verified position or go into failsafe mode. They cannot correct transmission errors.

In the early 21st century, 2.4 gigahertz (GHz) transmissions have become increasingly utilised in high-end control of model vehicles and aircraft. This range of frequencies has many advantages. Because the 2.4 GHz wavelengths are so short (around 10 centimetres), that the antennas on the receivers do not need to exceed 3 to 5 cm. Electromagnetic noise, for example from electric motors, is not 'seen' by 2.4 GHz receivers due to the noise's frequency (which tends to be around 10 to 150 MHz). The transmitter antenna only needs to be 10 to 20 cm long, and receiver power usage is much lower; batteries can therefore last longer. In addition, no crystals or frequency selection is required as the latter is performed automatically by the transmitter. However, the short wavelengths do not diffract as easily as the longer wavelengths of PCM/PPM, so 'line of sight' is required between the transmitting antenna and the receiver. Also, should the receiver lose power, even for a few milliseconds, or get 'swamped' by 2.4 GHz interference, it can take a few seconds for the receiver - which, in the case of 2.4 GHz, is almost invariably a digital device - to re-sync.

== Design ==
RC electronics have three essential elements. The transmitter is the controller. Transmitters have control sticks, triggers, switches, and dials at the user's finger tips. The receiver is mounted in the model. It receives and processes the signal from the transmitter, translating it into signals that are sent to the servos and speed controllers. The number of servos in a model determines the number of channels the radio must provide.

Typically the transmitter multiplexes and modulates the signal into pulse-position modulation. The receiver demodulates and demultiplexes the signal and translates it into the special kind of pulse-width modulation used by standard RC servos and controllers.

In the 1980s, a Japanese electronics company, Futaba, copied wheeled steering for RC cars. It was originally developed by Orbit for a transmitter specially designed for Associated cars It has been widely accepted along with a trigger control for throttle. Often configured for right hand users, the transmitter looks like a pistol with a wheel attached on its right side. Pulling the trigger would accelerate the car forward, while pushing it would either stop the car or cause it to go into reverse. Some models are available in left-handed versions.

== Mass production ==
There are thousands of RC vehicles available. Most are toys suitable for children. What separates toy grade RC from hobby grade RC is the modular characteristic of the standard RC equipment. RC toys generally have simplified circuits, often with the receiver and servos incorporated into one circuit. It's almost impossible to take that particular toy circuit and transplant it into other RCs.

=== Hobby grade RC ===
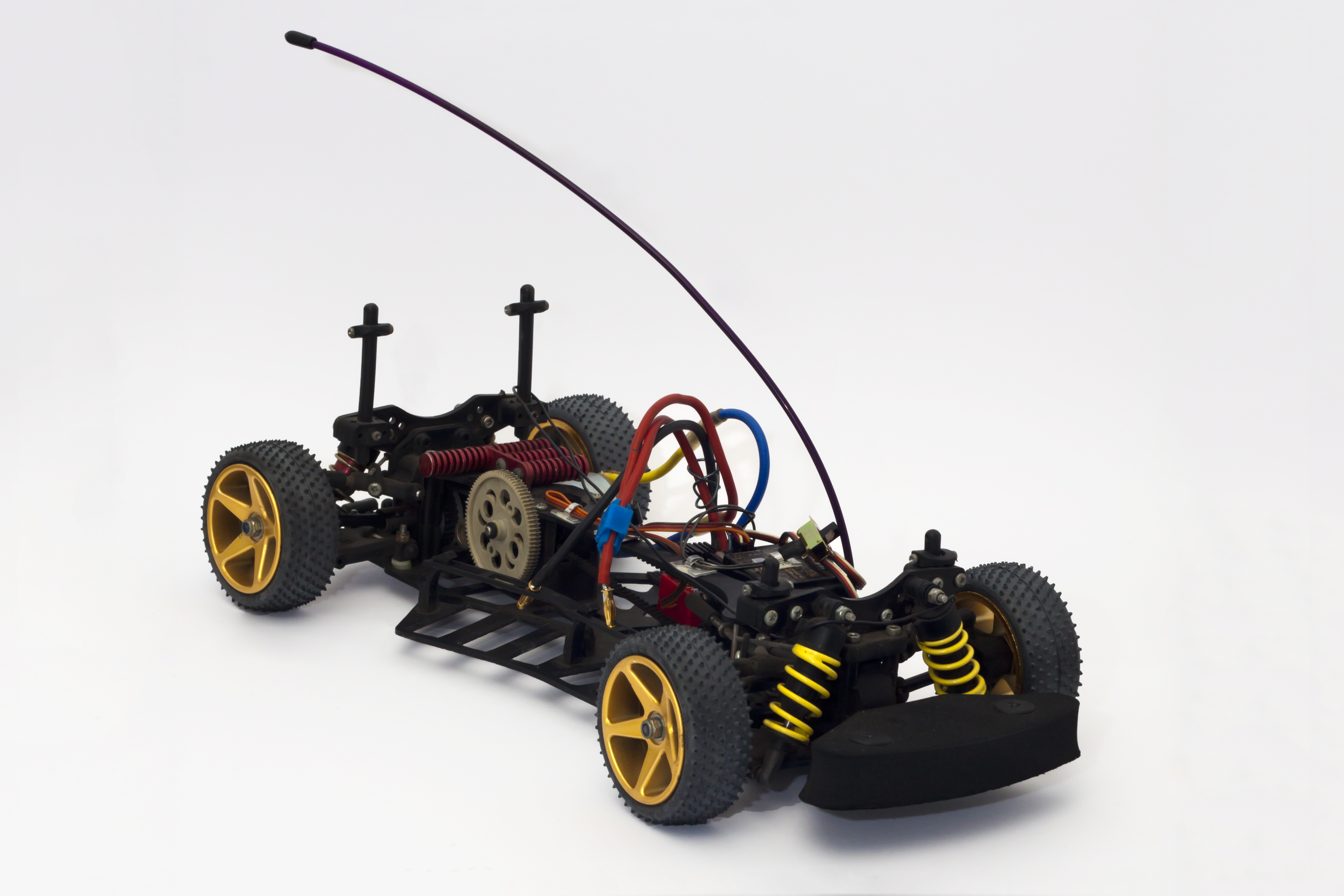
The 'Shumacher S.S.T.2000' RC Car. Shown here without the body kit or battery pack installed to allow for a clearer view of a hobby grade car.

Hobby grade RC systems have modular designs. Many cars, boats, and aircraft can accept equipment from different manufacturers, so it is possible to take RC equipment from a car and install it into a boat, for example.

However, moving the receiver component between aircraft and surface vehicles is illegal in most countries as radio frequency laws allocate separate bands for air and surface models. This is done for safety reasons.

Most manufacturers now offer "frequency modules" (known as crystals) that simply plug into the back of their transmitters, allowing one to change frequencies, and even bands, at will. Some of these modules are capable of "synthesizing" many different channels within their assigned band.

Hobby grade models can be fine tuned, unlike most toy grade models. For example, cars often allow toe-in, camber and caster angle adjustments, just like their real-life counterparts. All modern "computer" radios allow each function to be adjusted over several parameters for ease in setup and adjustment of the model. Many of these transmitters are capable of "mixing" several functions at once, which is required for some models.

Many of the most popular hobby grade radios were first developed, and mass-produced in Southern California by Orbit, Bonner, Kraft, Babcock, Deans, Larson, RS, S&O, and Milcott. Later, Japanese companies like Futaba, Sanwa and JR took over the market.

== Types ==
=== Aircraft ===
Radio-controlled aircraft (also called RC aircraft) are small aircraft that can be controlled remotely. There are many different types, ranging from small park flyers to large jets and mid-sized aerobatic models. The aircraft use many different methods of propulsion, ranging from brushed or brushless electric motors, to internal combustion engines, to the most expensive gas turbines. The fastest aircraft, dynamic slope soarers, can reach speeds of over 450 mph (720 km/h) by dynamic soaring, repeatedly circling through the gradient of wind speeds over a ridge or slope. Newer jets can achieve above 300 mph (480 km/h) in a short distance.

=== Tanks ===
Radio-controlled tanks are replicas of armored fighting vehicles that can move, rotate the turret and some even shoot all by using the hand-held transmitter. Radio-controlled tanks are produced in numerous scale size for commercial offerings like:

1/35th scale. Probably the best known make in this scale is by Tamiya.

1/24 scale. This scale often includes a mounted Airsoftgun, the possibly the best offering is by Tokyo-Marui, but there are imitations by Heng Long, who offer cheap remakes of the tanks. The downsides to the Heng Long imitations are that they were standardized to their Type 90 tank which has 6 road wheels, then they produced a Leopard 2 and M1A2 Abrams on the same chassis but both of the tanks have 7 road wheels.

1/16 scale is the more intimidating vehicle design scale. Tamiya produce some of the best of this scale, these usually include realistic features like flashing lights, engine sounds, main gun recoil and - on their Leopard 2A6 - an optional gyro-stabilization system for the gun. Chinese manufacturers such as (Heng Long and Matorro) also produce a variety of high-quality 1/16 tanks and other AFVs.

Both the Tamiya and the Heng Long vehicles can make use of an Infra Red battle system, which attaches a small IR "gun" and target to the tanks, allowing them to engage in direct battle.

As with cars, tanks can come from ready to run to a full assembly kit.

In more private offerings there are 1/6 and 1/4 scale vehicles available. The largest RC tank available anywhere in the world is the King tiger in 1/4 scale, over 8 feet (2.4 m) long. These GRP fiberglass tanks were originally created and produced by Alex Shlakhter.

=== Cars ===
A radio-controlled car is a powered model car driven from a distance. Gasoline, nitro-methanol and electric cars exist, designed to be run both on and off-road. "Gas" cars traditionally use petrol (gasoline), though many hobbyists run 'nitro' cars, using a mixture of methanol and nitromethane, to get their power.

=== Logistic ===
Logistic RC model include the following, Tractor unit, Semi-trailer truck, Semi-trailer, Terminal tractor, Refrigerator truck, Forklift truck, Empty Container handlers, and Reach stacker. Most of them are in 1:14 and run on electric motors.

=== Helicopters ===
Radio-controlled helicopters, although often grouped with RC aircraft, are unique because of the differences in construction, aerodynamics and flight training. Several designs of RC helicopters exist, some with limited maneuverability (and thus easier to learn to fly), and those with more maneuverability (and thus harder to learn to fly).

=== Boats ===
Radio-controlled boats are model boats controlled remotely with radio control equipment. The main types of RC boat are: scale models (12 inches (30 cm) – 144" (365 cm) in size), the sailing boat and the power boat. The latter is the more popular amongst toy grade models. Radio controlled models were used for the children's television program Theodore Tugboat.

The rise of gas-powered model boating followed the popularity of radio-controlled model boats.

Radio-controlled, gasoline-powered model boats first appeared in 1962 designed by engineer Tom Perzinka of Octura Models. The gas model boats were powered with O&R (Ohlsson and Rice) small 20 cc ignition gasoline utility engines. This was a completely new concept in the early years of available radio-control systems. The boat was called the "White Heat" and was a hydro design, meaning it had more than one wetted surface.

Towards the late 1960s and early 1970s another gasoline-powered model was created and powered with a similar chainsaw engine. This boat was named "The Moppie" after its full-size counterpart. Again like the White Heat, between the costs of production, engine, and radio equipment, the project failed at market and perished.

By 1970, nitro (glow ignition) power became the norm for model boating.

In 1982 Tony Castronovo, a hobbyist in Fort Lauderdale, Florida, marketed the first production gasoline string trimmer engine powered (22 cc gasoline ignition engine) radio-controlled model boat in a 44-inch vee-bottom boat. It achieved a top speed of 30 miles per hour. The boat was marketed under the trade name "Enforcer" and sold by his company Warehouse Hobbies, Inc. The following years of marketing and distribution aided the spread of gasoline-powered model boating throughout the US, Europe, Australia, and many countries around the world.

As of 2010, gasoline radio-controlled model boating has grown worldwide. The industry has spawned many manufacturers and thousands of model boaters. Today the average gasoline-powered boat can easily run at speeds over 45 mph, with the more exotic gas boats running at speeds exceeding 90 mph. This year also saw ML Boatworks develop laser cut wood scale hydroplane racing kits that rejuvenated a sector of the hobby that was turning to composite boats, instead of the classic art of building wood models. These kits also gave fast electric modelers a platform much needed in the hobby.

Many of Tony Castronovo's designs and innovations in gasoline model boating are the foundation upon which the industry has been built. He was first to introduce surface drive on a Vee hull (propeller hub above the water line) to model boating which he named "SPD" (surface planing drive) as well as numerous products and developments relative to gasoline-powered model boating. He and his company continue to produce gasoline-powered model boats and components.

=== Submarines ===
Radio-controlled submarines can range from inexpensive toys to complex projects involving sophisticated electronics. Oceanographers and the Military also operate radio control submarines.

=== Combat robotics ===
The majority of robots used in shows such as Battlebots and Robot Wars are remotely controlled, relying on most of the same electronics as other radio-controlled vehicles. They are frequently equipped with weapons for the purpose of damaging opponents, including but not limited to hammering axes, "flippers" and spinners.

== Power ==
=== Internal combustion ===
Internal combustion engines for remote control models have typically been two stroke engines that run on specially blended fuel. Engine sizes are typically given in cm^{3} or cubic inches, ranging from small engines 0.32 cubic centimetres (0.020 cu in) to big 26 cubic centimetres (1.6 cu in) or larger. For even larger sizes, many modelers turn to four stroke or gasoline engines (see below.) Glow plug engines have an ignition device that possesses a platinum wire coil in the glow plug, that catalytically glows in the presence of the methanol in glow engine fuel, providing the combustion source.

Since 1976, practical "glow" ignition four stroke model engines have been available on the market, ranging in size from 3.5 cubic centimetres (0.21 cu in) upwards to 35 cubic centimetres (2.1 cu in) in single cylinder designs. Various twin and multi-cylinder glow ignition four stroke model engines are also available, echoing the appearance of full sized radial, inline and opposed cylinder aircraft powerplants. The multi-cylinder models can become enormous, such as the Saito five cylinder radial. They tend to be quieter in operation than two stroke engines, using smaller mufflers, and also use less fuel.

Glow engines tend to produce large amounts of oily mess due to the oil in the fuel. They are also much louder than electric motors.

Another alternative is the gasoline engine. While glow engines run on special and expensive hobby fuel, gasoline runs on the same fuel that powers cars, lawnmowers, weed whackers etc. These typically run on a two-stroke cycle, but are radically different from glow two-stroke engines. They are typically much, much larger, like the 80 cm^{3} Zenoah. These engines can develop several horsepower, incredible for something that can be held in the palm of the hand.

=== Electrical ===
Electric power is often the chosen form of power for aircraft, cars and boats. Electric power in aircraft in particular has become popular recently, mainly due to the popularity of park flyers and the development of technologies like brushless motors and lithium polymer batteries. These allow electric motors to produce much more power rivaling that of fuel-powered engines. It is also relatively simple to increase the torque of an electric motor at the expense of speed, while it is much less common to do so with a fuel engine, perhaps due to its roughness. This permits a more efficient larger-diameter propeller to be used which provides more thrust at lower airspeeds. (e.g. an electric glider climbing steeply to a good thermalling altitude.)

In aircraft, cars, trucks and boats, glow and gas engines are still used even though electric power has been the most common form of power for a while. The following picture shows a typical brushless motor and speed controller used with radio controlled cars. As you can see, due to the integrated heat sink, the speed controller is almost as large as the motor itself. Due to size and weight limitations, heat sinks are not common in RC aircraft electronic speed controller (ESCs), therefore the ESC is almost always smaller than the motor.

== Controlling methods ==
=== Remote Control ===
Most RC models make use of a handheld remote device with an antenna that sends signals to the vehicle's IR receiver. There are 2 different sticks. On the left is the stick to change the altitude of a flying vehicle or move a ground vehicle in forward or reverse. Sometimes the stick in flying model controllers can stay wherever the finger places it or it has to be held since underneath is a spring causing it to move back to its neutral position once released by the finger. Generally, in remotes used for ground moving RC vehicles the left stick's neutral position is in the centre. The right stick is for moving the flying vehicle around in the air in different directions and with grounds vehicles it is for steering. On the controller is also a trimmer setting which helps in keeping the vehicle focused in one direction. Mostly low grade RC vehicles will include a charging cable inside the remote with a green light indicating that the battery is in charge.

=== Phone and tablet control ===
With the influence of touch screen devices mostly phones and tablets many RC vehicles can be controlled from any Apple or Android devices. On the operating system store is an app specifically for that particular RC model. The controls are almost identical to those on a physically used remote control when using virtual remote control but sometimes can vary from an actual controller depending on the type of vehicle. The device is not included with the vehicle set but the box does come with a radio chip to insert into the headset slot of any smartphone or tablet.

== See also ==
- Anderson Powerpole connector
- Drone racing
- JST connector
- Model yachting
