= Battery eliminator circuit =

Voltage regulator in battery-powered equipment

In battery-powered equipment, a battery eliminator circuit (BEC) is an electronic voltage regulator used to power a subsystem at a different voltage without the need for a supplemental battery. BECs are commonly used in radio-controlled models, which need separate voltages to power the motor and the RC equipment.

== Radio-controlled (RC) models ==
In an electric-powered radio-controlled model, the BEC is typically part of the electronic speed control (ESC). BEC allows such a model to carry only one battery (the motive power battery) instead of two (motive power, and a separate battery to operate the RC equipment). A BEC-equipped ESC meant for airplane use often incorporates a low-voltage-cutoff (LVC) circuit which can sense the voltage drop caused when the battery has little charge left. It then cuts the power to the 'drive' motor in order to provide the 'steering' servo(s) with enough power to be able to bring the model safely back to the operator. The power to the propeller is cut but the operation of the control surfaces would be maintained in order to perform a dead-stick landing. Without this feature, all control would be lost when the battery expired, probably resulting in the destruction of the model. In some cases, the BEC is part of the radio control receiver, instead of being part of the ESC.

RC BECs in their simplest form use a linear fixed voltage regulator with its standard circuit suggested in the manufacturer's datasheet – usually the power supply of the receiver needs 5 V. Low-dropout types are preferred – especially for batteries with only a few cells. For small models, 1.5 to 2 A are enough; for mid-size models a 3 A type needs to be considered. BECs for large models have to provide current of 5 A or more. In this case, a more complicated switching mode regulator should be used, as the switching mode BECs are more electrically efficient than linear regulator BECs. The power dissipation losses in a linear regulator BEC are a product of the difference between the target voltage of 5 volts and the voltage of the main battery multiplied by the required current. For example, take a 10-cell NiMH accumulator with a normal voltage of 12 volts. With a peak current of 5 A, the BEC will have losses of (12 V − 5 V) × 5 A = 35 W. With a linear regulator, these 35 W will be converted to heat and so require a large heat sink. This is an efficiency of (5 V / 12 V) = 41.7%. However, a switching mode regulator with a buck step-down supply can achieve over 90% efficiency. In all cases, it is a good idea to mount some large capacitors to buffer the regulated output. In large plane or ship models, another possibility is to buffer the power supply with a further capacitor near the actuators (servos).

More recent uses for RC BECs are converting higher-voltage lithium polymer battery packs to 12 V. This has occurred due to the increased popularity of camera equipment for FPV use. Several BEC manufacturers offer a BEC (voltage regulator) for this purpose and people may become confused as this is 'out of the ordinary' to use a BEC for a 12 V application.

BECs are often sub-categorized by their placement and circuitry. As its name implies, the switching battery elimination circuit (SBEC) is a switch-mode design. It is often sized specific to the ESC power requirements and contained near or integral to the ESC board. The universal battery elimination circuit (UBEC) is a separate component that is generally oversized to enable power to servos and auxiliary devices. It may replace, operate alongside, or provide a level of redundancy to the ESC's own BEC.

== Vehicles ==
BECs are also used in some motorcycle and ATV applications to reduce the weight penalty involved in carrying a battery. The battery is typically replaced by one or more large but light-weight capacitors which smooth out the fluctuating electrical pulses coming from the alternator, without themselves generating power. As there is no electrical power source, electrical starters cannot be used.

== See also ==
- JST connector
- Voltage regulator
