= Vibration galvanometer =

A vibration galvanometer is a type of mirror galvanometer, usually with a coil suspended in the gap of a magnet or with a permanent magnet suspended in the field of an electromagnet. The natural oscillation frequency of the moving parts is carefully tuned to a specific frequency; commonly 50 or 60 Hz. Higher frequencies up to 1 kHz are possible. Since the frequency depends on the mass of the moving elements, high frequency vibration galvanometers are very small with light coils and mirrors. The tuning of the vibration galvanometer is done by adjusting the tension of the suspension spring.

The vibration galvanometer is used for detecting alternating currents in the frequency of its natural resonance. Most common application is as a null indicating instrument in AC bridge circuits and current comparators.

The sharp resonance of the vibration galvanometer makes it very sensitive to changes in the measured current frequency and it can be used as an accurate tuning device.

== Frequency display ==
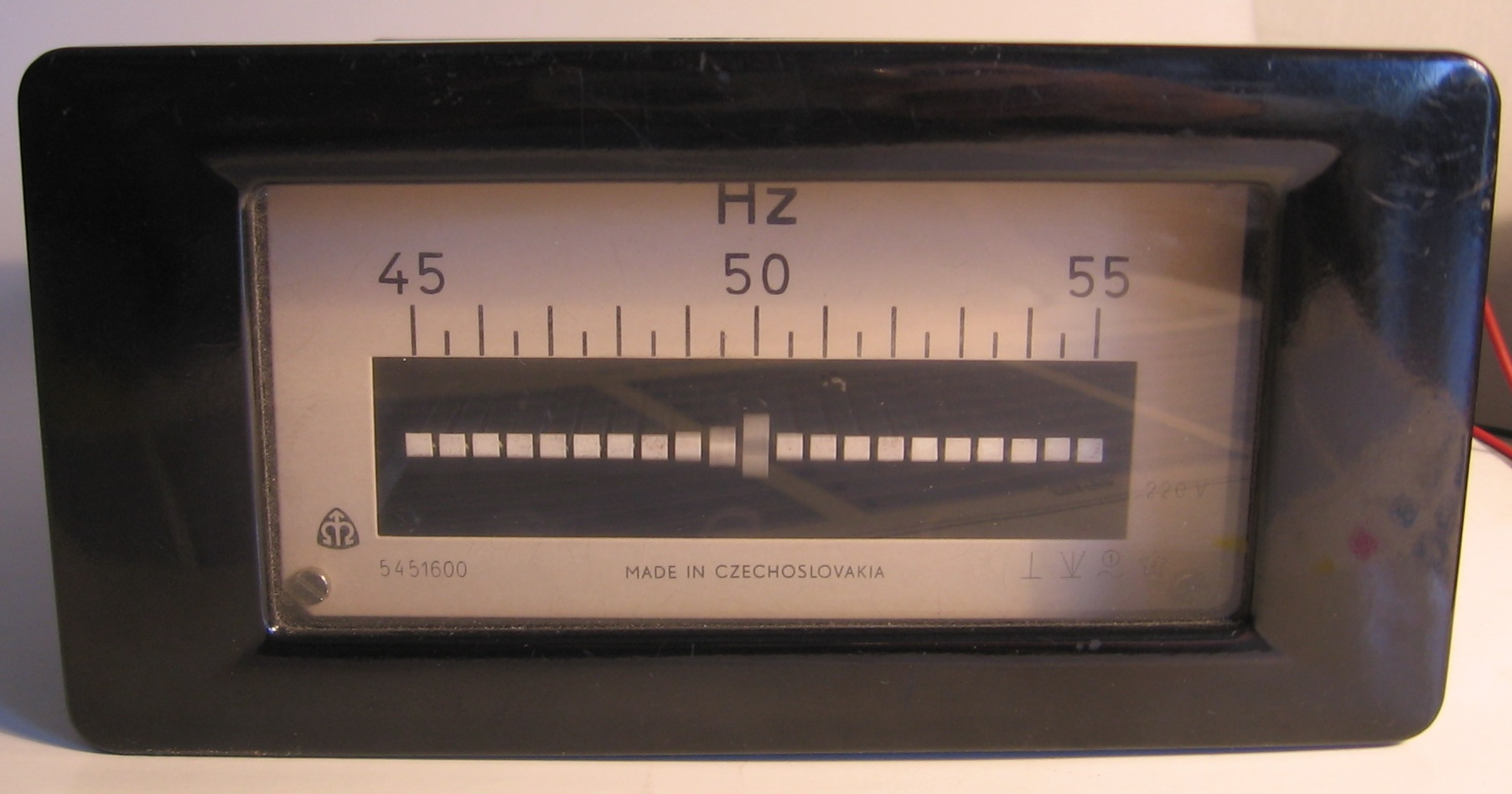
A 50 Hz ±5 Hz vibrating-reed mains frequency meter for 220 V

The frequency-sensitive behaviour of the galvanometer allows their use as a crude frequency meter, commonly used for adjusting the speed of AC generator sets. The galvanometer is constructed as a number of moving-iron galvanometers, sharing the same excitation coil. As each is tuned to a slightly different frequency, one of them will resonate at a time, according to the input frequency. The magnets are conveniently constructed as a single iron 'comb' of individual reeds, each of different length. Their range is typically from around 45-55 Hz (for a 50 Hz base frequency), with around 2 Hz resolution between each. As it is the identity of the vibrating reed (and thus frequency) that is of interest, rather than its amplitude, these are not calibrated. They are often viewed end-on, as the clearest viewpoint for the whole comb.

== See also ==
- Reed receiver
