= Electronic speed control =

Electronic circuit that control motor speed

An electronic speed control (ESC) is an electronic circuit that controls and regulates the speed of an electric motor. It may also provide reversing of the motor and dynamic braking. Miniature electronic speed controls are used in electrically powered radio controlled models. Full-size electric vehicles also have systems to control the speed of their drive motors.

== Function ==
An electronic speed control follows a speed reference signal (derived from a throttle lever, joystick, or other manual input) and varies the switching rate of a network of field effect transistors (FETs). By adjusting the duty cycle or switching frequency of the transistors, the speed of the motor is changed. The rapid switching of the current flowing through the motor is what causes the motor itself to emit its characteristic high-pitched whine, especially noticeable at lower speeds.

Different types of speed controls are required for brushed DC motors and brushless DC motors. A brushed motor can have its speed controlled by varying the voltage on its armature. (Industrially, motors with electromagnet field windings instead of permanent magnets can also have their speed controlled by adjusting the strength of the motor field current.) A brushless motor requires a different operating principle. The speed of the motor is varied by adjusting the timing of pulses of current delivered to the several windings of the motor.

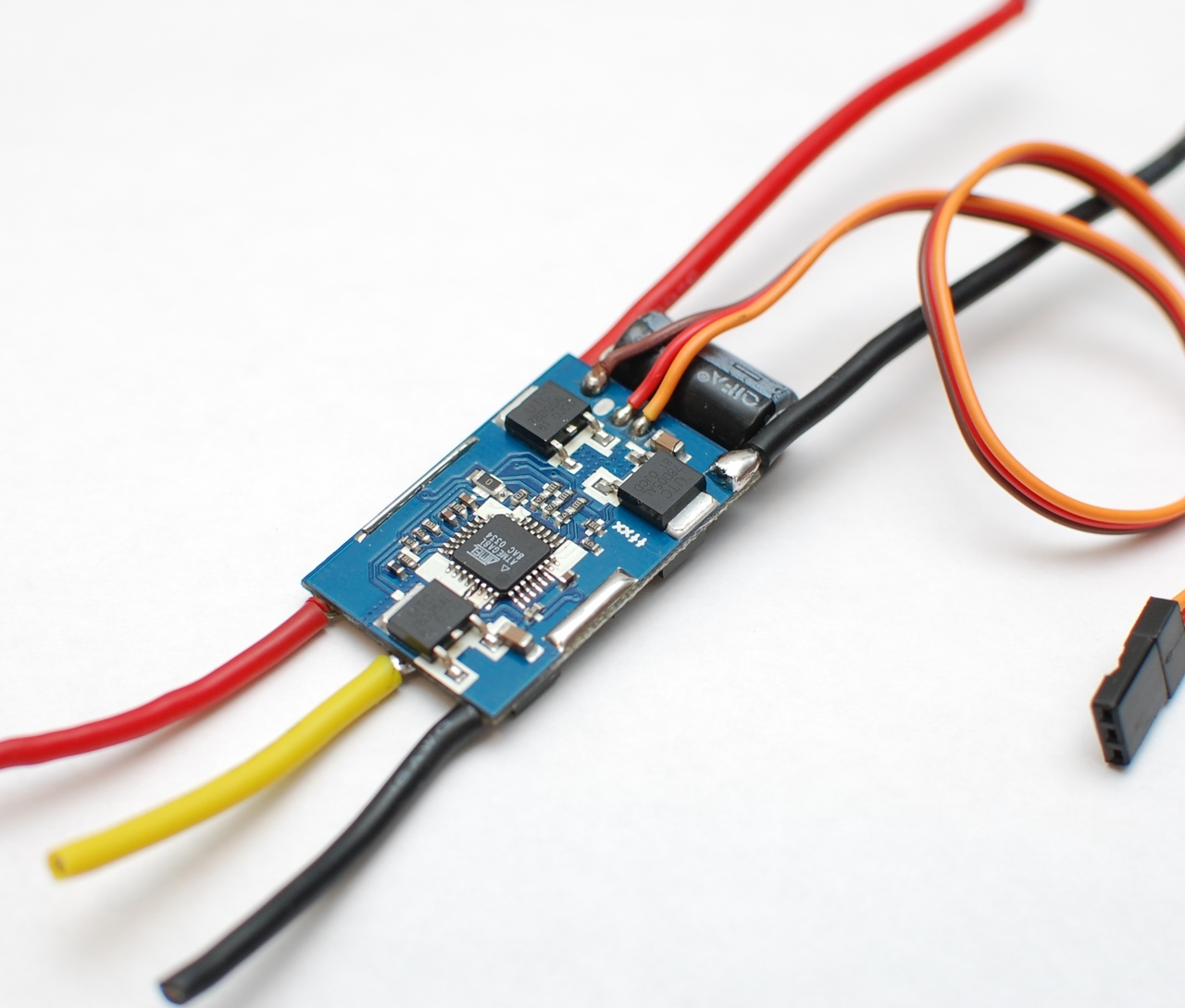
A generic ESC module rated at 35 amperes with an integrated eliminator circuit

Brushless ESC systems basically create three-phase AC power, like a variable frequency drive, to run brushless motors. Brushless motors are popular with radio controlled airplane hobbyists because of their efficiency, power, longevity and light weight in comparison to traditional brushed motors. Brushless DC motor controllers are much more complicated than brushed motor controllers.

The correct phase of the current fed to the motor varies with the motor rotation, which is to be taken into account by the ESC: Usually, back EMF from the motor windings is used to detect this rotation, but variations exist that use separate magnetic (Hall effect) sensors or optical detectors. Computer-programmable speed controls generally have user-specified options which allow setting low voltage cut-off limits, timing, acceleration, braking and direction of rotation. Reversing the motor's direction may also be accomplished by switching any two of the three leads from the ESC to the motor.

== Classification ==
ESCs are normally rated according to maximum current, for example, 25 amperes (25 A). Generally the higher the rating, the larger and heavier the ESC tends to be, which is a factor when calculating mass and balance in airplanes. Many modern ESCs support nickel metal hydride, lithium ion polymer and lithium iron phosphate batteries with a range of input and cut-off voltages. The type of battery and number of cells connected is an important consideration when choosing a battery eliminator circuit (BEC), whether built into the controller or as a stand-alone unit. A higher number of cells connected will result in a reduced power rating and therefore a lower number of servos supported by an integrated BEC, if it uses a linear voltage regulator. A well designed BEC using a switching regulator should not have a similar limitation.

== ESC firmware ==
Most modern ESCs contain a microcontroller interpreting the input signal and appropriately controlling the motor using a built-in program, or firmware. In some cases it is possible to change the factory built-in firmware for an alternate, publicly available, open source firmware. This is done generally to adapt the ESC to a particular application. Some ESCs are factory built with the capability of user upgradable firmware. Others require soldering to connect a programmer. ESCs are usually sold as black boxes with proprietary firmware. As of 2014, a Swedish engineer named Benjamin Vedder started an open source ESC project later called VESC. The VESC project has since attracted attention for its advanced customization options and relatively reasonable build price compared to other high end ESCs.

== Vehicle applications ==
=== Electric cars ===
Large, high-current ESCs are used in electric cars, such as the Nissan Leaf, Tesla Roadster (2008), Model S, Model X, Model 3, and the Chevrolet Bolt. The energy draw is usually measured in kilowatts (the Nissan Leaf, for instance, uses a 160 kW motor that produces up to 340 Nm torque ). Most mass-produced electric cars feature ESCs that capture energy when the car coasts or brakes, using the motor as a generator and slowing the car down. The captured energy is used to charge the batteries and thus extend the driving range of the car (this is known as regenerative braking). In some vehicles, such as those produced by Tesla, this can be used to slow down so effectively that the car's conventional brakes are only needed at very low speeds (the motor braking effect diminishes as the speed is reduced). In others, such as the Nissan Leaf, there is only a slight "drag" effect when coasting, and the ESC modulates the energy capture in tandem with the conventional brakes to bring the car to a stop.

ESCs used in mass-produced electric cars usually have reversing capability, allowing the motor to run in both directions. The car may only have one gear ratio, and the motor simply runs in the opposite direction to make the car go in reverse. Some electric cars with DC motors also have this feature, using an electrical switch to reverse the direction of the motor, but others run the motor in the same direction all the time and use a traditional manual or automatic transmission to reverse direction (usually this is easier, since the vehicle used for the conversion already has the transmission, and the electric motor is simply installed in place of the original engine).

=== Electric bicycles and scooters ===
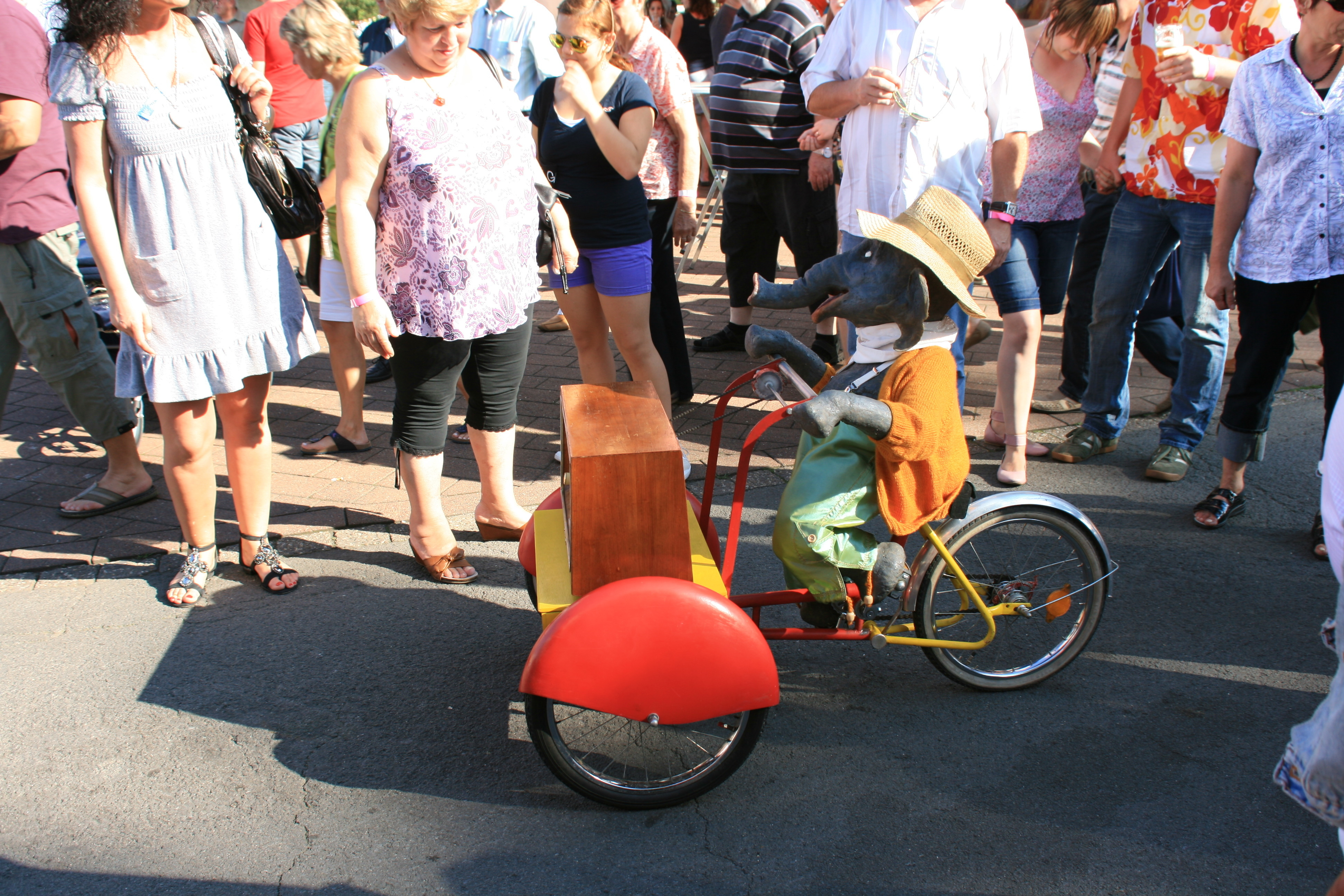
Electric bicycle with electronics

A motor used in an electric bicycle application requires high initial torque and therefore uses Hall effect sensors for speed measurement. Electric bicycle controllers generally use brake application sensors and pedal rotation sensors, and provide potentiometer-adjustable motor speed, closed-loop speed control for precise speed regulation, protection logic for over-voltage, over-current, and thermal protection. Sometimes pedal torque sensors are used to enable motor assistance proportional to applied torque and sometimes support is provided for regenerative braking; however, infrequent braking and the low mass of bicycles limit recovered energy. An implementation is described in a whitepaper by Zilog on an ebike hub motor controller for a 200 W, 24 V brushless DC electric (BLDC) motor.

P.A.S or PAS may appear within the list of components of electric conversion kits for bicycles, which implies Pedal Assistance Sensor or sometimes Pulse Pedal Assistance Sensor. Pulse usually relates to a magnet and sensor which measures the rotational velocity of the crank. Pedal pressure sensors under the feet are possible but not common.

== Remote control applications ==
An ESC can be a stand-alone unit which plugs into the receiver's throttle control channel or incorporated into the receiver itself, as is the case in most toy-grade R/C vehicles. Some R/C manufacturers that install proprietary hobby-grade electronics in their entry-level vehicles, vessels or aircraft use onboard electronics that combine the two on a single circuit board.

Electronic speed controls for model RC vehicles may incorporate a battery eliminator circuit to regulate voltage for the receiver, removing the need for separate receiver batteries. The regulator may be linear or switched mode. ESCs, in a broader sense, are PWM controllers for electric motors. The ESC generally accepts a nominal 50 Hz PWM servo input signal whose pulse width varies from 1 ms to 2 ms. When supplied with a 1 ms width pulse at 50 Hz, the ESC responds by turning off the motor attached to its output. A 1.5 ms pulse-width input signal drives the motor at approximately half-speed. When presented with 2.0 ms input signal, the motor runs at full speed.

=== Cars ===
ESCs designed for sport use in cars generally have reversing capability; newer sport controls can have the reversing ability overridden so that it can not be used in a race. Controls designed specifically for racing and even some sport controls have the added advantage of dynamic braking capability. The ESC forces the motor to act as a generator by placing an electrical load across the armature. This in turn makes the armature harder to turn, thus slowing or stopping the model. Some controllers add the benefit of regenerative braking.

=== Helicopters ===
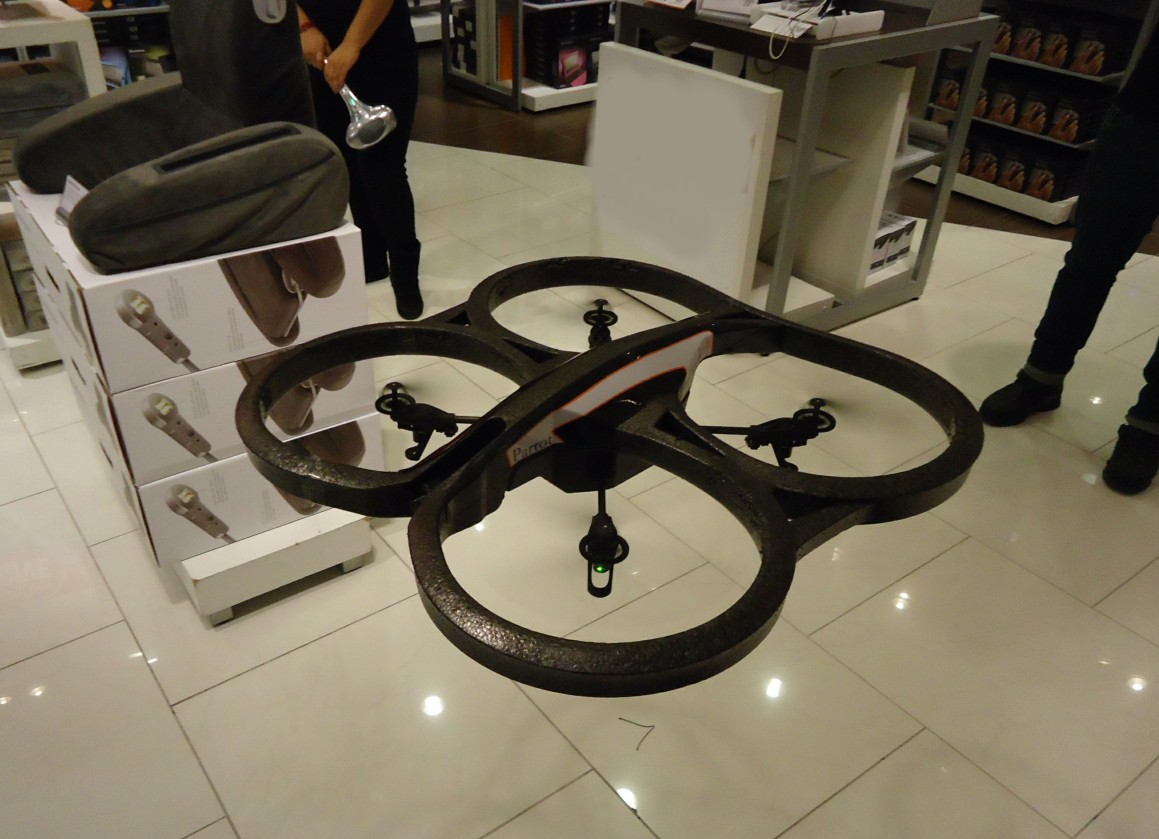
Drone

ESCs designed for radio-control helicopters do not require a braking feature (since the one-way bearing would render it useless anyhow) nor do they require reverse direction (although it can be helpful since the motor wires can often be difficult to access and change once installed).

Many high-end helicopter ESCs provide a "governor mode" which fixes the motor RPM to a set speed, greatly aiding CCPM-based flight. It is also used in quadcopters.

=== Airplanes ===
ESCs designed for radio-control airplanes usually contain a few safety features. If the power coming from the battery is insufficient to continue running the electric motor, the ESC will reduce or cut off power to the motor while allowing continued use of ailerons, rudder and elevator function. This allows the pilot to retain control of the airplane to glide or fly on low power to safety.

=== Boats ===
ESCs designed for boats are by necessity waterproof. The watertight structure is significantly different from that of non-marine type ESCs, with a more packed air trapping enclosure. Thus arises the need to cool the motor and ESC effectively to prevent rapid failure. Most marine-grade ESCs are cooled by circulated water run by the motor, or negative propeller vacuum near the drive shaft output. Like car ESCs, boat ESCs have braking and reverse capability.

=== Quadcopters ===
Electronic Speed Controllers (ESC) are an essential component of modern quadcopters (and all multirotors), offering high power, high frequency, high resolution 3-phase AC power to a motor in an extremely compact miniature package. These craft depend entirely on the variable speed of the motors driving the propellers. Fine speed control over a wide range in motor/prop speed gives all of the control necessary for a quadcopter (and all multirotors) to fly.

Quadcopter ESCs usually can use a faster update rate compared to the standard 50 Hz signal used in most other RC applications. A variety of ESC protocols beyond PWM are utilized for modern-day multirotors, including, Oneshot42, Oneshot125, Multishot, and DShot. DShot is a digital protocol that offers certain advantages over classical analog control, such as higher resolution, CRC checksums, and lack of oscillator drift (removing the need for calibration). Modern day ESC protocols can communicate at speeds of 37.5 kHz or greater, with a DSHOT2400 frame only taking 6.5 μs.

=== Model trains ===
Most table top or small scale electric model trains are powered by electricity transported by the rails or by an overhead wire to the vehicle and so the electronic speed control does not have to be on board. This is however not the case for model trains with digital steering systems allowing multiple trains to run on the same track with different speed at the same time.

Larger, ride-on models such as 5 inch or 7 inch gauge usually have batteries and speed controllers on board.

== See also ==
- Electronic control unit, automotive electronics control system
- JST connector, family of electric connectors
- Motor controller, used for electric motor performance coordination
- Throttle
