= Reed receiver =

Decoder in early radio control systems

A reed receiver or tuned reed receiver (US) was a form of multi-channel signal decoder used for early radio control systems. It uses a simple electromechanical device or 'resonant reed' to demodulate the signal, in effect a receive-only modem. The encoding used is a simple form of frequency-shift keying.

These decoders appeared in the 1950s and were used into the early 1970s. Early transistor systems were in use in parallel to them, but they were finally displaced by the appearance of affordable digital proportional systems, based on early integrated circuits. These had the advantage of proportional control.

== Operation ==
The decoder of the reed receiver is based on the 'resonant reed' unit. This comprises a number of vibrating metal reeds, each one having a tuned vibration frequency like a tuning fork. These reeds are manufactured from a single tapered sheet of iron or steel, giving a comb of reeds of varying length. This resembles the comb used to sound musical notes in a music box. Like a music box, the length of each reed affects its resonant frequency. The reeds are powered magnetically, by a single solenoid coil and an iron core wrapped between the ends of the reeds.

A reed's resonant frequency is a mid-range audible frequency of perhaps 300 Hz. The solenoid is driven by the output of the radio control receiver, (Note: Receivers in use at this time would be 27 MHz AM superhet receivers.) which is an audio tone or tones. If the receiver output contains the appropriate tone for the resonant frequency of a reed, that reed would be made to vibrate. As the reed vibrates, it touches a contact screw above its free end. These contacts form the output of the decoder. Decoder outputs are generally fed to small relays. These allow a high current load to be controlled, such as the model's propulsion motor. Using a relay also adds a damping time constant to the output, so that the intermittent contact with the reed contact (which is vibrating at the transmitter audible tone frequency) becomes a continuous output signal.

Each reed forms an independent channel and they may be activated individually or in combination, depending on the signal from the transmitter.

Reed system channels are an on/off output, not a proportional (i.e. analogue) signal. (Note: "Proportional" was the contemporary term for what would now be considered an "analogue" signal. The first common commercial proportional systems in the late 1960s were described as "digital proportional" or "digi-prop" systems. This was because their decoders were implemented internally with digital electronics and integrated circuits, even though their purpose was to be what we would now call an analogue system.) These could be used to drive an escapement, or rapidly switching a channel on and off could be used as pulse-width modulation to provide a proportional signal to drive a servo.

== Number of channels ==
To avoid potential problems with harmonic frequencies simultaneously activating multiple reeds, the reed frequencies were kept within an octave of each other. (Note: The first harmonic would be an octave higher, so a total range of less than this avoids the problem.) The number of distinct frequencies usable within this range depends on the selectivity or Q factor of each reed. Typical radio control reed units used six reeds, sometimes four or eight on simpler or more sophisticated systems.

The sensitivity of each reed is controlled by mechanically adjusting the contact screw above each reed. This adjustment is critical and temperamental, so a system where reed resonance is pronounced and separate from the other reeds is easiest to adjust. If adjacent reeds also vibrate (at a lesser amplitude) for the same tone, the contact adjustment must not be too sensitive, or else it could be false-triggered by an adjacent channel. This problem becomes worse, the more closely the channels are spaced.

Twelve reed systems were known, but were only required for large ship models, typically warships, with many channels for triggering "working features" such as turrets and cannon firing. In practice these were unreliable and so these models used a sequential drum sequencer instead. One channel, probably from a reed, would be used to step the sequencer through each step of a pre-planned demonstration sequence.

=== Hedy Lamarr ===
It is sometimes incorrectly claimed that the origin of the resonant reed decoder was in the wartime torpedo-control patent granted to the actress Hedy Lamarr. This patent did precede spread spectrum radio technology, but the frequency-hopping it describes is primarily applied to the radio carrier wave, not the signal coding. A minor aspect of the radio control system described does use a similar frequency-keying mechanism to select left and right rudder, also this is done by separate filters, presumably electronic rather than reed, of 50 & 100 Hz. As these two frequencies are exactly an octave apart, they could also suffer from the harmonic interference problem described above.

== Transmitters ==
A suitable transmitter need only generate a number of audio tones. Most had a single oscillator, that generated different tones as control buttons were pressed one-by-one. As the control actuators on the model were usually escapements at this time, this limitation was relatively minor. (Note: An escapement relies on a control pulse being sent to step it from position to position, not to hold it in position.) To keep the channels fully independent and simultaneously triggerable, would have required a separate oscillator for each channel, not merely a single tunable oscillator. In the valve era before transistors, that would have been unusually expensive. Many period transmitters merely used a number of push-button switches on their case, although some combined these into joystick or wheel controls.

== Similar devices ==
=== Aircraft navigation ===
Resonant reeds, used as mechanical filters in a radio tone decoder, appear in the early 1930s as part of radio navigation systems. Multiple courses were signalled by use of radio beam transmitters. Tones of 65 Hz, 86.7 Hz, and 108.3 Hz were modulated onto these beam transmissions, the position of the beam and its audio modulation being space modulated onto the ideal position of the course and the guard beam areas to either side of it.

By visually monitoring the vibrating reeds, the pilot could determine their position within the radio beams, and thus over the ground.

=== Radio paging ===
Early radio paging systems such as the Bell Telephone BELLBOY system used a shared carrier frequency and audio tone coding to identify the correct recipient of a message. These selectors used a tuning fork resonator rather than a simple single reed. This gives a more selective mechanical filter, allowing more frequencies to be spaced closely together. Even more importantly, the false-triggering harmonic for a tuning fork is more than six times its natural frequency, rather than merely twice its frequency, as for a reed. This means that the useful frequency range is over two octaves, rather than less than one octave. Multiple reeds could also be used together, either to identify separate frequencies to give multiple indications, or logically ANDed together to require more subscriber selections with a 2-code identifier rather than a single code.

=== Frequency measurement ===
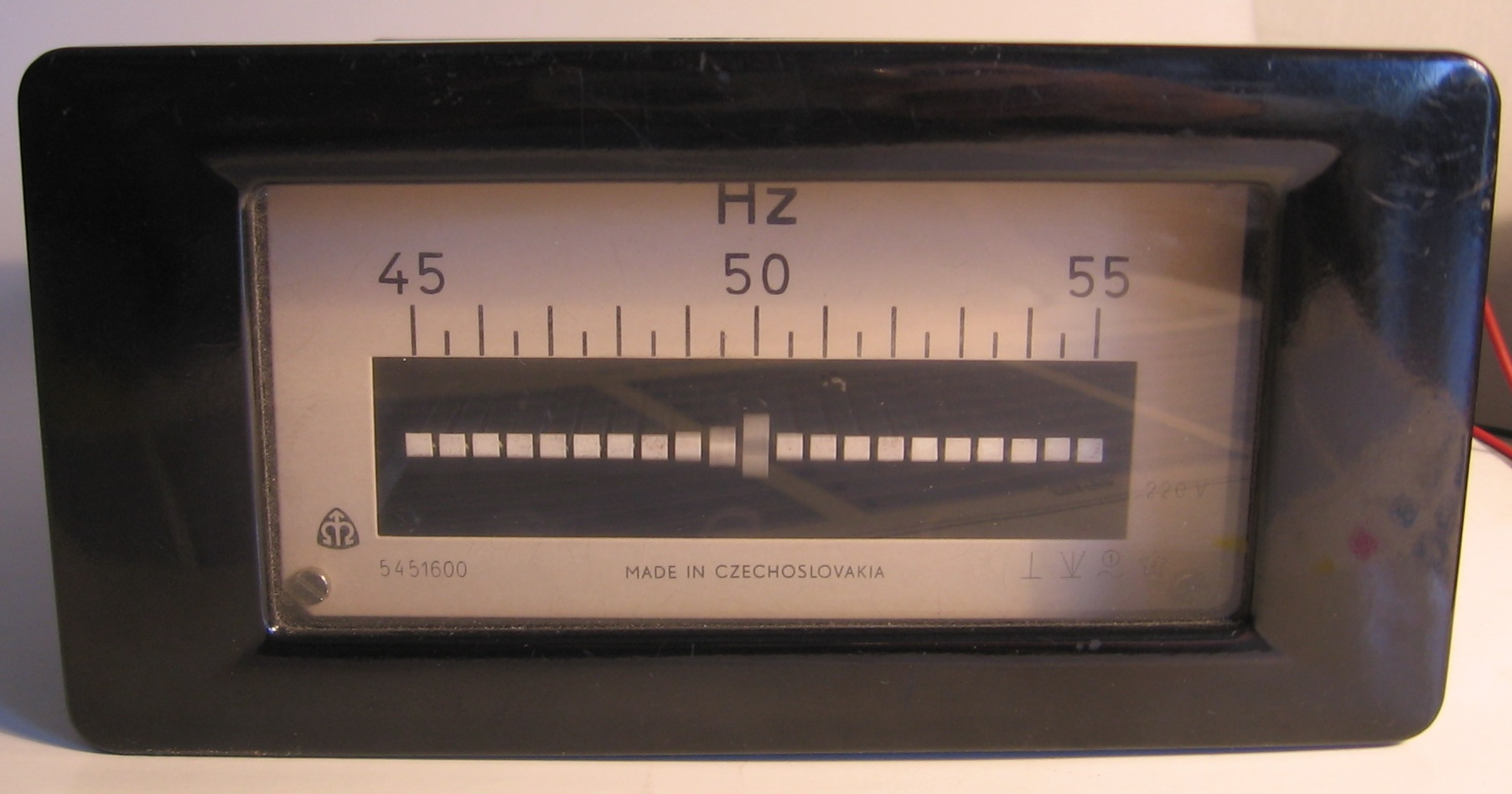
A 50 Hz ±5 Hz vibrating-reed mains frequency meter for 220 V.

Vibrating reed indicators have been used for a low-cost display of frequency. This was typically used for a small generator set, where maintaining an output frequency of 50 Hz or 60 Hz was needed. A comb of reeds centered on this frequency would be mounted edge-on to the control panel and the vibrations of the reed with the greatest amplitude could be seen directly. The reeds used in such an indicator have their ends bent perpendicular to the rest of the reed to give a larger area to view, instead of the small cross-section of the thin metal they are made of.

== See also ==
- Vibration galvanometer
