= JST connector =

Standard Japanese electrical connector

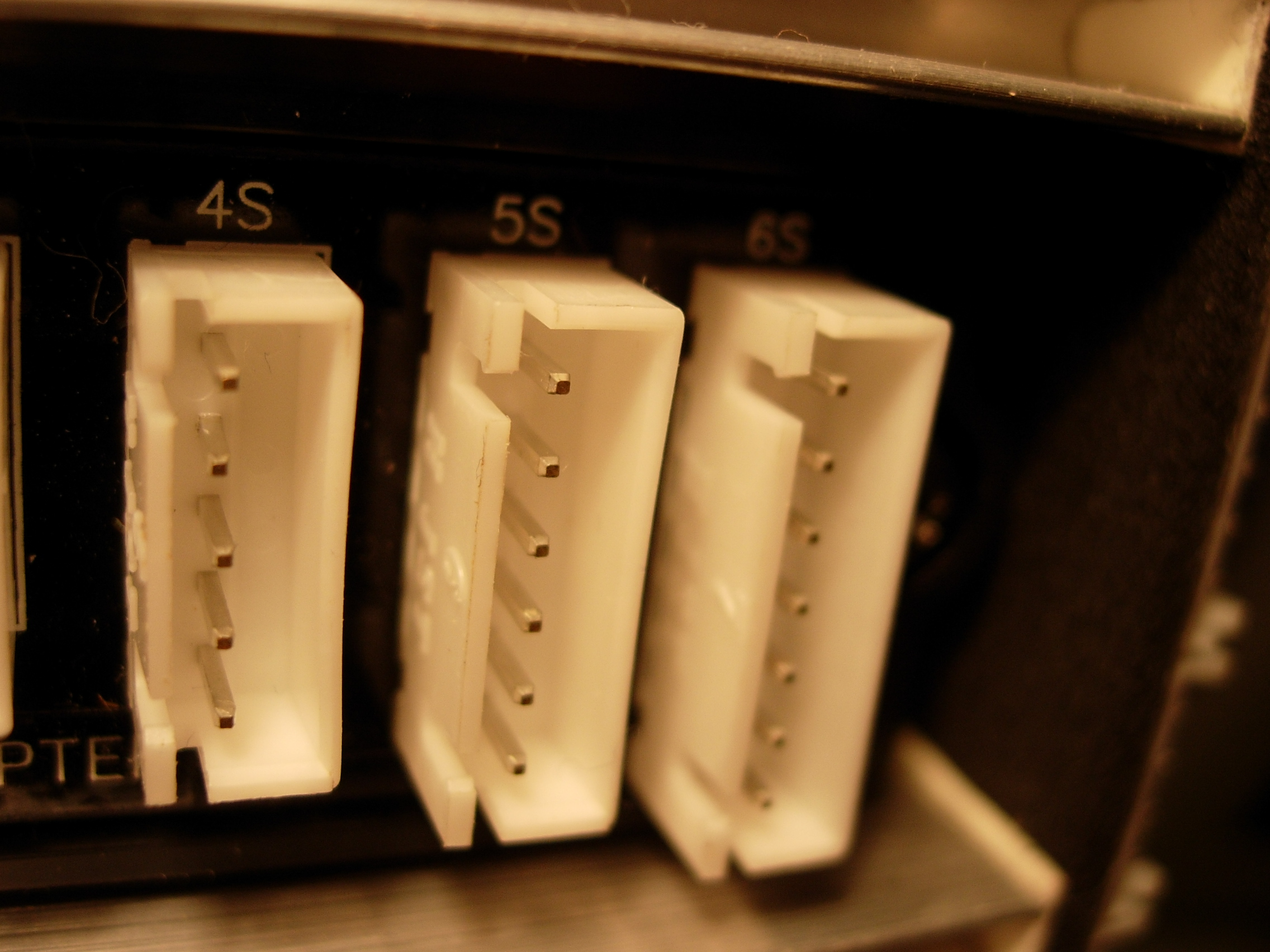
2.50 mm JST-XH top-entry (vertical) male PCB connectors

JST connectors are electrical connectors manufactured to the design standards originally developed by J.S.T. Mfg. Co. (Japan Solderless Terminal). JST manufactures numerous series (families) and pitches (pin-to-pin distance) of connectors.

JST connectors are used in many types of products, and commonly used by electronics hobbyists and consumer products for rechargeable battery packs, battery balancers, battery eliminator circuits, 3D printers, and radio controlled servos.

Sometimes the term "JST" is used generically to refer to any small white electrical connector mounted on printed circuit boards.

== Connector series ==
JST manufactures a large number of series (families) of connectors. The PCB (wire-to-board) connectors are available in top (vertical) or side (horizontal) entry, and through-hole or surface-mount.

Wire-to-board connectors
JST series	Pin-to-pin pitch	Pin rows	Current (Amp)	Voltage (Volt)	Wire size (AWG)	Shroud	Lock	Notes	Datasheet
VH	3.96 mm (0.156 in)	1	10	250	22 to 16	Yes/No	Yes	Unshrouded seems to be more popular than shrouded.	JST VH
RE	2.54 mm (0.100 in)	1	2	250	30 to 24	No	No	Similar to female "DuPont" connectors and male pin headers. RF series is double row.	JST RE
EH	2.50 mm (0.098 in)	1	3	250	32 to 22	Yes	No	Not 0.1-inch pitch.	JST EH
XA	2.50 mm (0.098 in)	1	3	250	30 to 20	Yes	Yes	Not 0.1-inch pitch.	JST XA
XH	2.50 mm (0.098 in)	1	3	250	30 to 22	Yes	Yes	Not 0.1-inch pitch. Used by many radio control (R/C) batteries.	JST XH
PA	2.00 mm (0.079 in)	1	3	250	28 to 22	Yes	Yes		JST PA
PH	2.00 mm (0.079 in)	1	2	100	32 to 24	Yes	No	Many stepper motors. Compatible with KR (IDC), KRD (IDC), CR (IDC) series.	JST PH
ZH	1.50 mm (0.059 in)	1	1	50	32 to 26	Yes	No	Compatible with ZR (IDC) and ZM (crimp) series.	JST ZH
GH	1.25 mm (0.049 in)	1	1	50	30 to 26	Yes	Yes	Not 0.05-inch pitch. Sometimes confused with Molex PicoBlade.	JST GH
GHD	1.25 mm (0.049 in)	2	1.25	50	30 to 26	Yes	Yes	Not 0.05-inch pitch. Double row type connector.	JST GHD
SH	1.00 mm (0.039 in)	1	1	50	32 to 28	Yes	No	Compatible with SR (IDC) and SZ (IDC) series.	JST SH
SHD	1.00 mm (0.039 in)	2	1	50	32 to 28	Yes	No	Double row type connector.	JST SHD
NSH	1.00 mm (0.039 in)	1	1	50	32 to 28	Yes	Yes	Lock type connector.	JST NSH
NSHD	1.00 mm (0.039 in)	2	1	50	32 to 28	Yes	Yes	Double row lock type connector.	JST NSHD

Wire-to-wire connectors
JST series	Pin-to-pin pitch	Pin rows	Current (Amp)	Voltage (Volt)	Wire size (AWG)	Features	Notes	Datasheet
RCY	2.50 mm (0.098 in)	1	3	250	28 to 22	Locking	Used in radio control (R/C), also known as BEC or P connector. Commonly found on small models, toys, and small LiPo packs.	JST RCY
SM	2.50 mm (0.098 in)	1	3	250	28 to 22	Locking, High force	Commonly used in LED lighting, appliances, and electric bikes and scooters.	JST SM

== Soldering ==
A majority of JST through-hole headers can't withstand the temperatures required for reflow soldering, because the plastic has a lower melting point since they were designed for wave soldering methods. Some JST surface-mount headers are designed to handle higher temperatures of reflow soldering.

== Confusion on the Internet ==
End-users and 3rd-party sellers on eBay often describe connectors by their wrong name thus perpetuating confusion of the exact series of a specific connector. It is very common in blogs and websites to incorrectly name a specific connector only by the name of the manufacturer.

To minimize confusion, it is best to describe a connector using: the manufacturer's name, exact connector series, and optionally the pitch, such as "JST-XH" or "JST-XH-2.50mm" or "2.50mm JST XH-series" or other variations.

The official J.S.T. Co. website allows users to check certain models for their authenticity and specifications.

Note: Some 2.50 mm parts are incorrectly sold on the Internet as 2.54 mm (0.100 in), and the 1.25 mm parts as 1.27 mm (0.050 in).

== Gallery ==
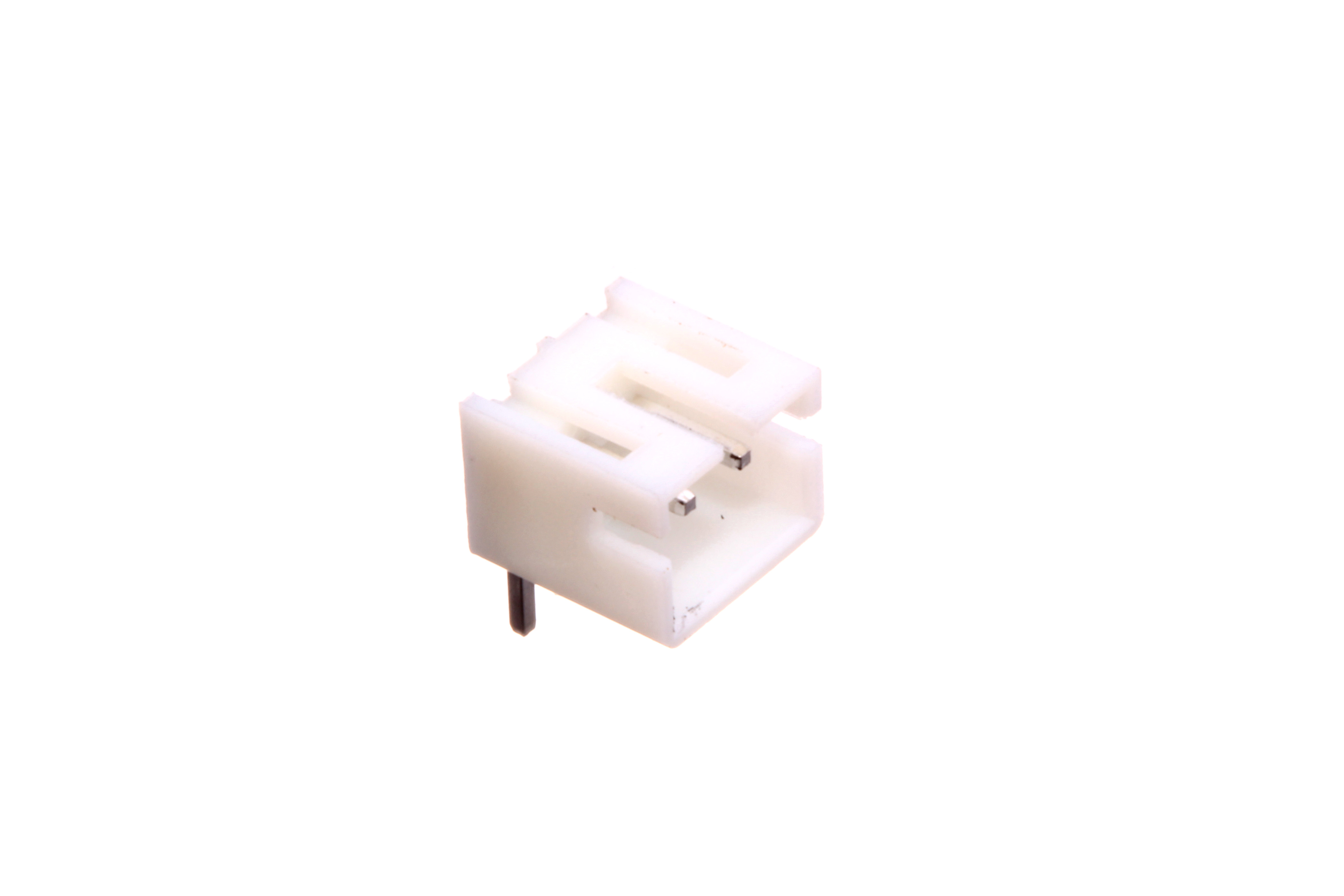
JST PH 2-pin right-angle through-hole PCB.

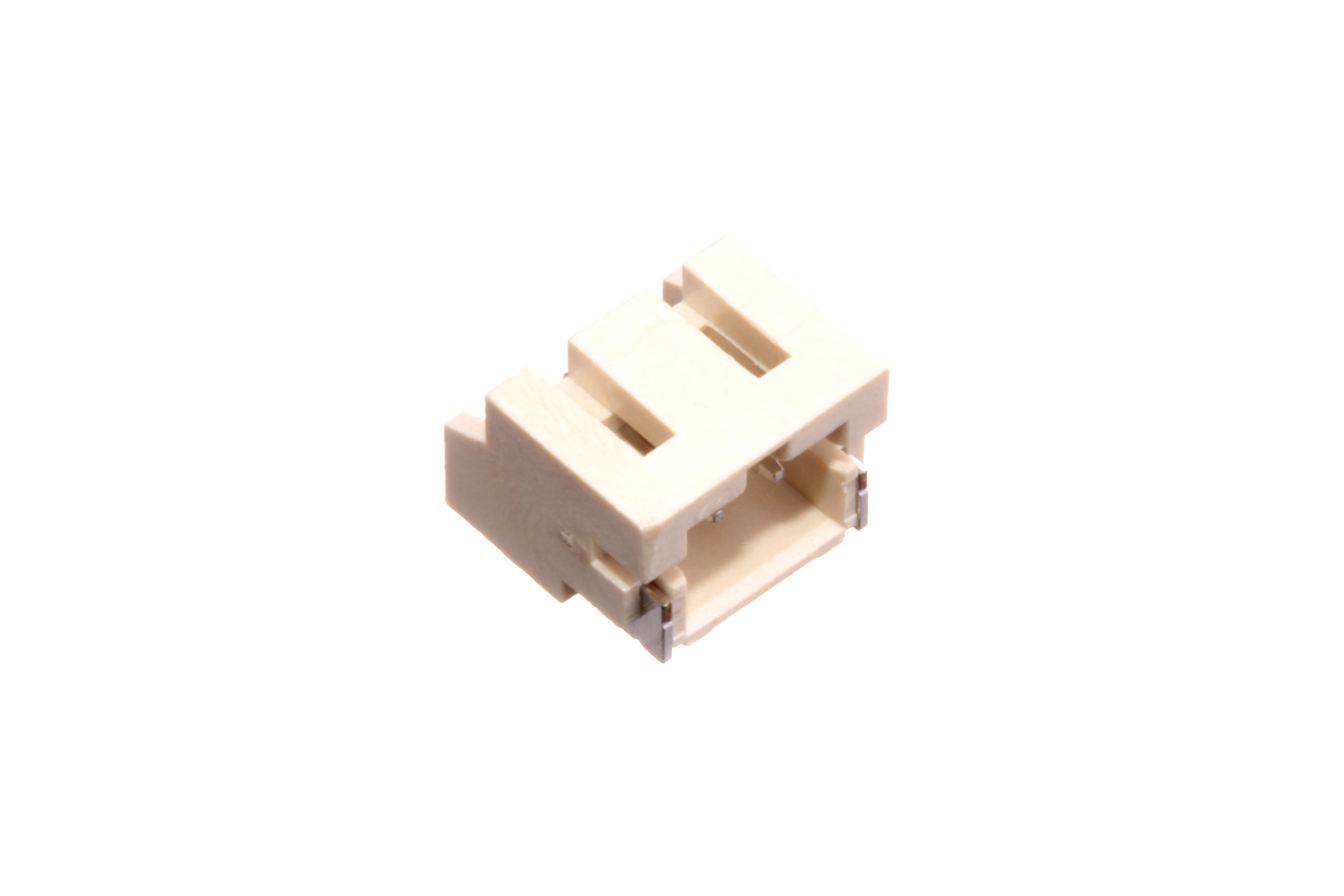
JST PH 2-pin right-angle surface-mount PCB.

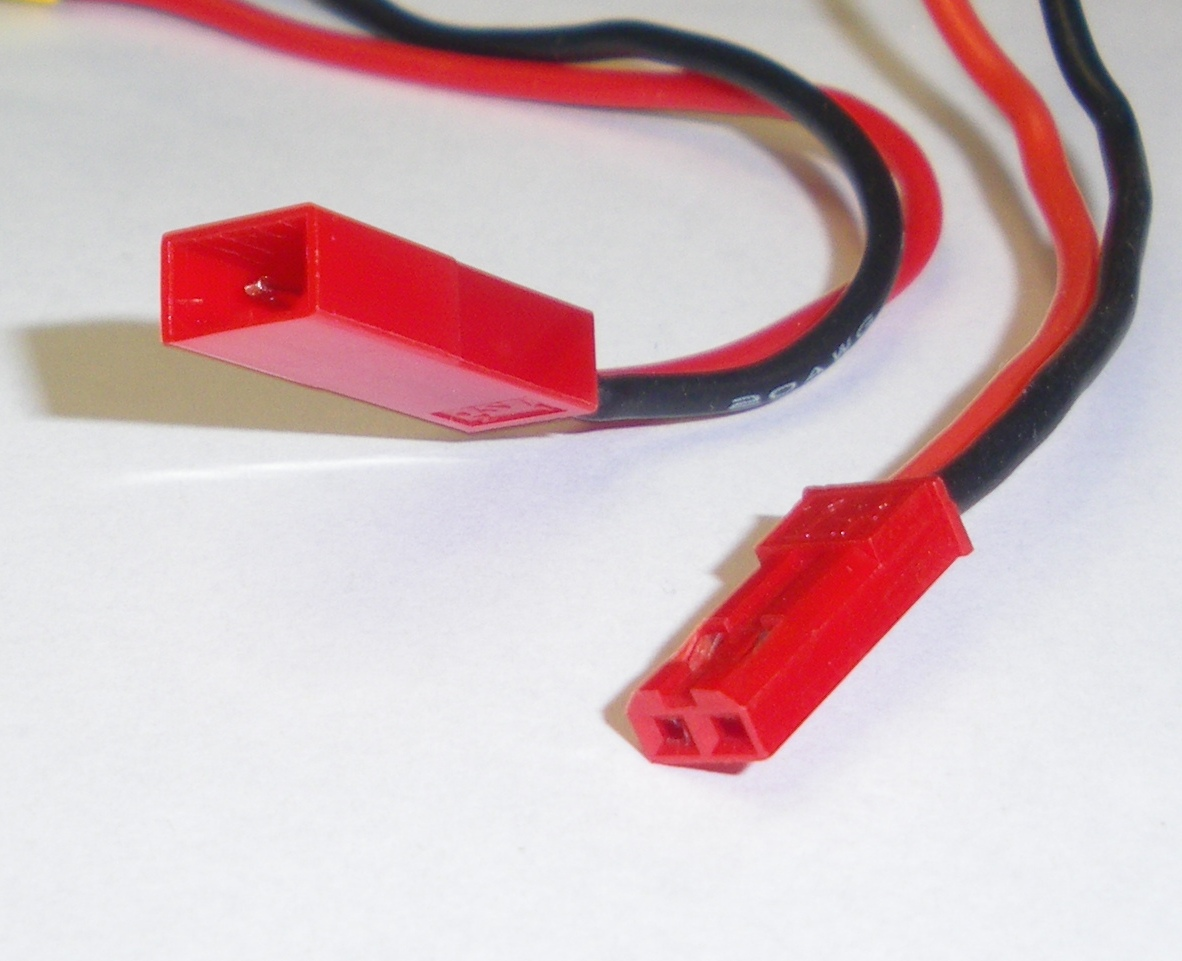
JST RCY 2-pin.

== See also ==
- DC connector
- Insulation-displacement connector (IDC)
- Electrical connector
- Pin header connector
