= Radio control =

Use of radio signals to remotely control a device, vehicle or drone

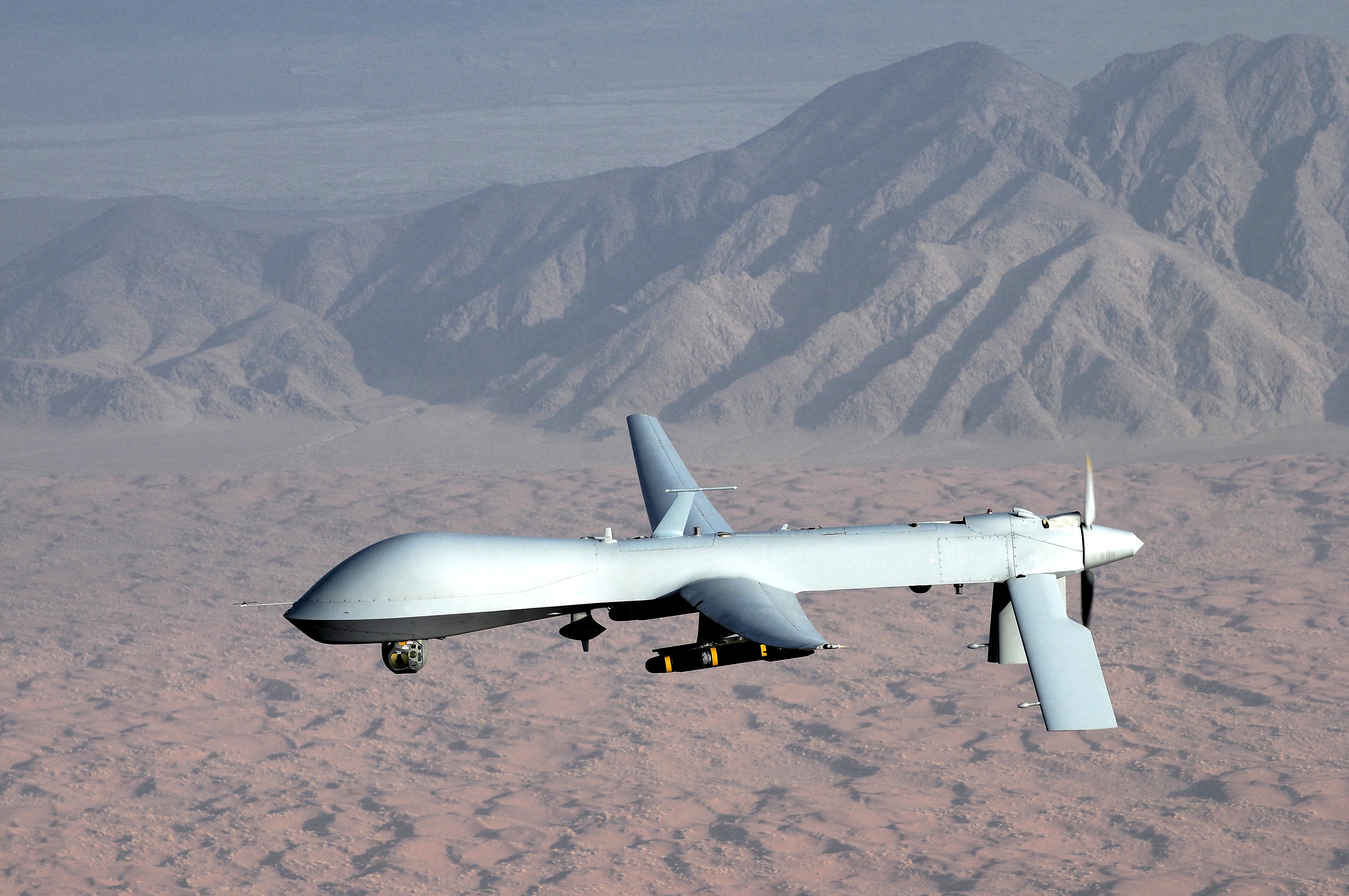
US Air Force MQ-1 Predator drone flown remotely by a pilot on the ground

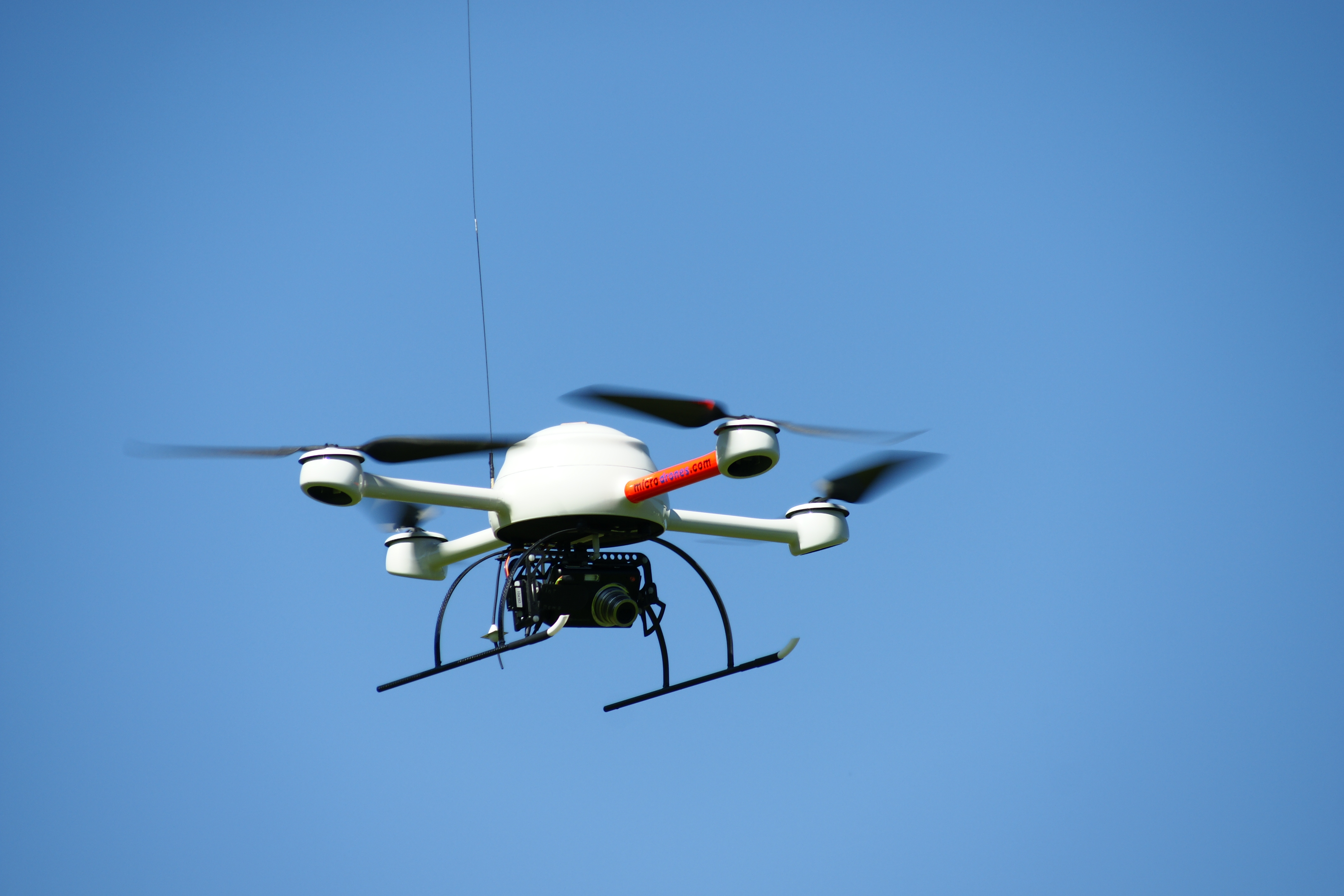
Quadcopter, a popular radio-controlled toy

Radio control (often abbreviated to RC) is the use of control signals transmitted by radio to remotely operate a device. Examples of simple radio control systems are garage door openers and keyless entry systems for vehicles, in which a small handheld radio transmitter unlocks or opens doors. Radio control is also used for control of model vehicles from a hand-held radio transmitter. Industrial, military, and scientific research organizations make use of radio-controlled vehicles as well. A rapidly growing application is control of unmanned aerial vehicles (UAVs or drones) for both civilian and military uses, although these have more sophisticated control systems than traditional applications.

== History ==
The idea of controlling unmanned vehicles (for the most part in an attempt to improve the accuracy of torpedoes for military purposes) predates the invention of radio. The latter half of the 1800s saw development of many such devices, connected to an operator by wires, including the first practical application invented by German engineer Werner von Siemens in 1870.

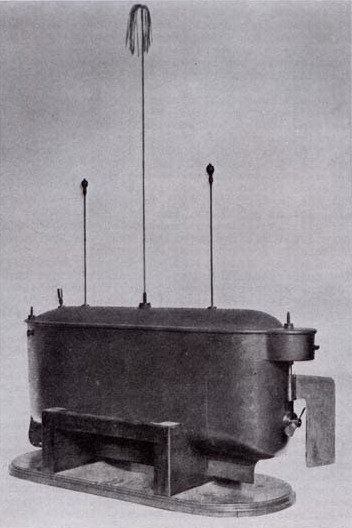
In 1898, Tesla demonstrated a radio-controlled scale boat.

Getting rid of the wires via using a new wireless technology, radio, appeared in the late 1890s. In 1897 British engineer Ernest Wilson and C. J. Evans patented a radio-controlled torpedo or demonstrated radio-controlled boats on the Thames river (accounts of what they did vary). At an 1898 exhibition at Madison Square Garden, Nikola Tesla demonstrated a small boat that used a coherer-based radio control. With an eye towards selling the idea to the US government as a torpedo, Tesla's 1898 patent included a clockwork frequency changer so an enemy could not take control of the device.

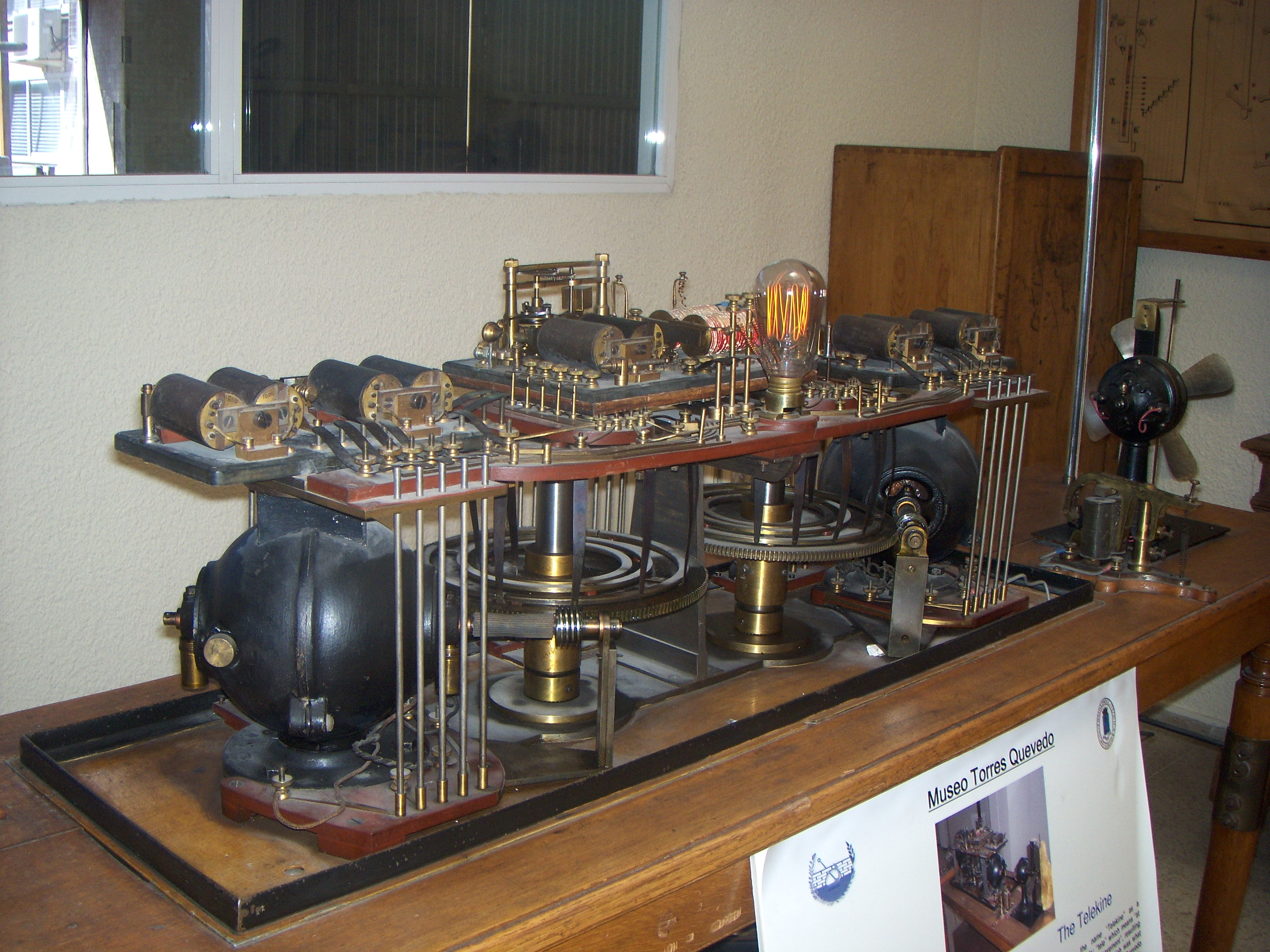
The Telekino, invented by Leonardo Torres Quevedo in 1903, which consisted of a robot that executed commands transmitted by electromagnetic waves.

In 1903, Spanish engineer Leonardo Torres Quevedo introduced a radio-based control system called the "Telekino" at the Paris Academy of Sciences and applied for patents in several countries. The system was intended to test the Astra-Torres airship—a dirigible of his own design—without risking human lives. While previous mechanisms relied on electromagnetic on/off signaling to follow a rigidly fixed sequence, Torres established a method capable of controlling devices with multiple operating states. This method required a transmitter able to send a variety of different code words using a binary telegraph key signal. It also featured a novel receiver that changed the device's operational state based on the specific code word received. The system could independently select different positions for the steering engine and manage different velocities for the propulsion engine. Simultaneously, it could actuate other mechanisms, such as switching an electric light or raising and lowering a flag, allowing for up to 19 distinct actions. In 1904, Torres conducted the first test on a three-wheeled land vehicle, achieving a range of 20 to 30 meters. In November 1905, he successfully tested a motorized dinghy in the Bilbao Abra bay with eight passengers on board, controlling it from the shore at a distance of over two kilometers. On 25 September 1906, Torres repeated the demonstration in the port of Bilbao before a large crowd and King Alfonso XIII, remotely steering the electric boat Vizcaya.

In 1904, Bat, a Windermere steam launch, was controlled using experimental radio control by its inventor, [Jack Kitchen]. In 1909 French inventor [Gabet] demonstrated what he called his "Torpille Radio-Automatique", a radio-controlled torpedo.

In 1917, Archibald Low, as head of the secret Royal Flying Corps (RFC) experimental works at Feltham, was the first person to use radio control successfully on an aircraft, a 1917 Aerial Target. It was "piloted" from the ground by future world aerial speed record holder Henry Segrave. Low's systems encoded the command transmissions as a countermeasure to prevent enemy intervention. By 1918 the secret D.C.B. Section of the Royal Navy's Signals School, Portsmouth under the command of Eric Robinson V.C. used a variant of the Aerial Target's radio control system to control from ‘mother’ aircraft different types of naval vessels including a submarine.

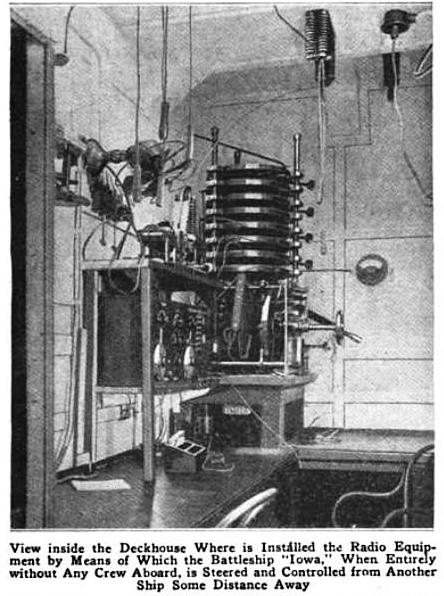
Radio control gear invented by John Hays Hammond, Jr. installed in the battleship USS Iowa (1922)

During World War I American inventor John Hays Hammond, Jr. developed many techniques used in subsequent radio control including developing remote controlled torpedoes, ships, anti-jamming systems and even a system allowing his remote-controlled ship targeting an enemy ship's searchlights. In 1922 he installed radio control gear on the obsolete US Navy battleship USS Iowa so it could be used as a target ship (sunk in gunnery exercise in March 1923).

The Soviet Red Army used remotely controlled teletanks during the 1930s in the Winter War against Finland and fielded at least two teletank battalions at the beginning of the Great Patriotic War. A teletank is controlled by radio from a control tank at a distance of 500–1500 m, the two constituting a telemechanical group. There were also remotely controlled cutters and experimental remotely controlled planes in the Red Army.

The United Kingdom's World War One development of their radio-controlled 1917 'Aerial Target' (AT) and 1918 'Distant Control Boat' (DCB) using Low's control systems led eventually to their 1930s fleet of "Queen Bee". This was a remotely controlled unmanned version of the de Havilland "Tiger Moth" aircraft for Navy fleet gunnery firing practice. The "Queen Bee" was superseded by the similarly named Airspeed Queen Wasp, a purpose-built target aircraft of higher performance.

== Second World War ==
Radio control was further developed during World War II, primarily by the Germans who used it in a number of missile projects. Their main effort was the development of radio-controlled missiles and glide bombs for use against shipping, a target otherwise both difficult and dangerous to attack. However, by the end of the war, the Luftwaffe was having similar problems attacking Allied bombers and developed a number of radio command guided surface-to-air anti-aircraft missiles, none of which saw service.

The effectiveness of the Luftwaffe's systems, primarily comprising the series of Telefunken Funk-Gerät (or FuG) 203 Kehl twin-axis, single joystick-equipped transmitters mounted in the deploying aircraft, and Telefunken's companion FuG 230 Straßburg receiver placed in the ordnance to be controlled during deployment and used by both the Fritz X unpowered, armored anti-ship bomb and the powered Henschel Hs 293 guided bomb, was greatly reduced by British efforts to jam their radio signals, eventually with American assistance. After initial successes, the British launched a number of commando raids to collect the missile radio sets. Jammers were then installed on British ships, and the weapons basically "stopped working". The German development teams then turned to wire-guided missiles once they realized what was going on, but the systems were not ready for deployment until the war had already moved to France.

The German Kriegsmarine operated FL-Boote (ferngelenkte Sprengboote) which were radio controlled motor boats filled with explosives to attack enemy shipping from 1944.

Both the British and US also developed radio control systems for similar tasks, to avoid the huge anti-aircraft batteries set up around German targets. However, no system proved usable in practice, and the one major US effort, Operation Aphrodite, proved to be far more dangerous to its users than to the target. The American Azon guided free-fall ordnance, however, proved useful in both the European and CBI Theaters of World War II.

Radio control systems of this era were generally electromechanical in nature, using small metal "fingers" or "reeds" with different resonant frequencies each of which would operate one of a number of different relays when a particular frequency was received. The relays would in turn then activate various actuators acting on the control surfaces of the missile. The controller's radio transmitter would transmit the different frequencies in response to the movements of a control stick; these were typically on/off signals. The radio gear used to control the rudder function on the American-developed Azon guided ordnance, however, was a fully proportional control, with the "ailerons", solely under the control of an on-board gyroscope, serving merely to keep the ordnance from rolling.

These systems were widely used until the 1960s, when the increasing use of solid state systems greatly simplified radio control. The electromechanical systems using reed relays were replaced by similar electronic ones, and the continued miniaturization of electronics allowed more signals, referred to as control channels, to be packed into the same package. While early control systems might have two or three channels using amplitude modulation, modern systems include twenty or more using frequency modulation.

== Radio-controlled models ==
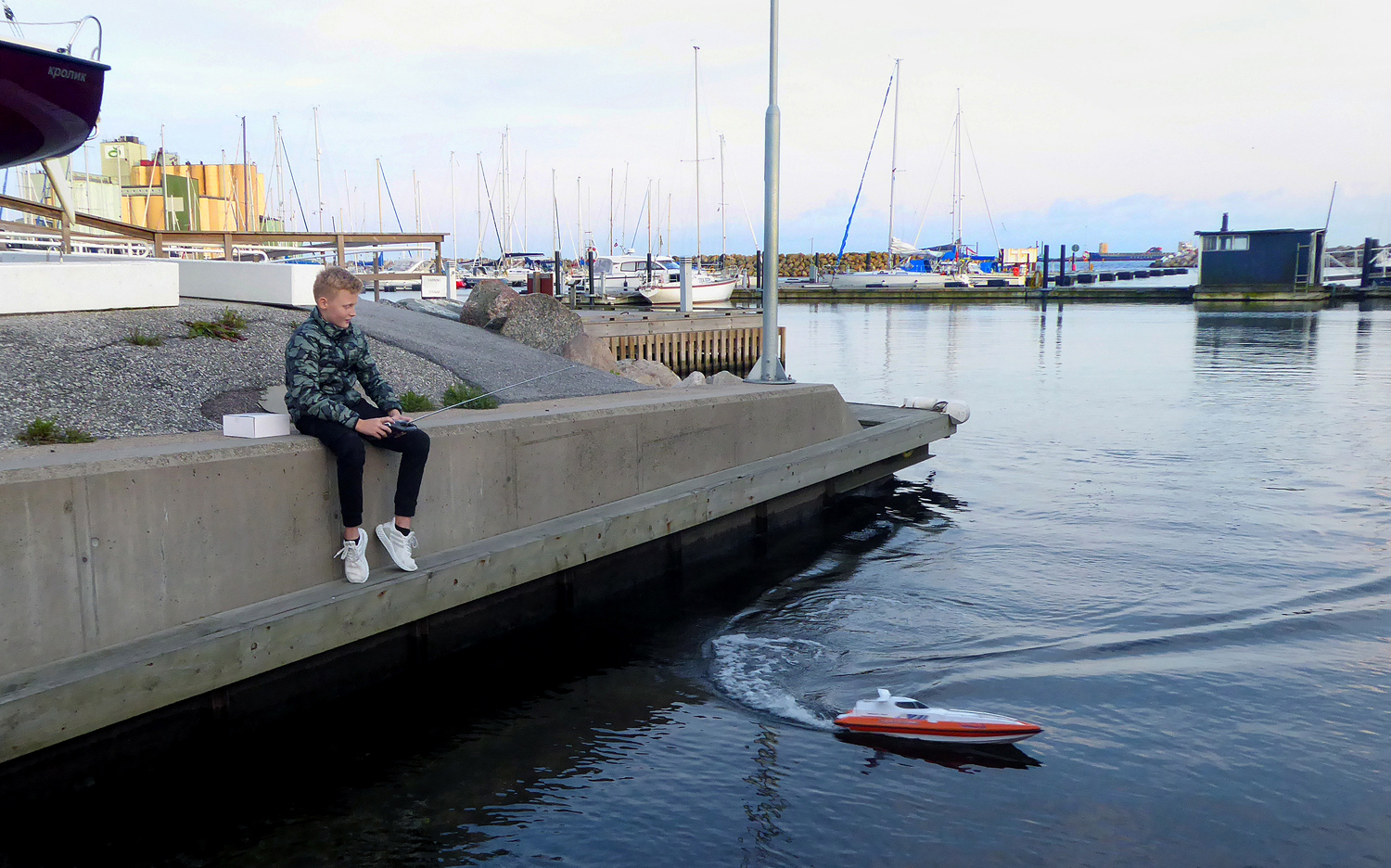
A boy runs his radio controlled boat in Ystad's marina 2019.

The first general use of radio control systems in models started in the early 1950s with single-channel self-built equipment; commercial equipment came later. The advent of transistors greatly reduced the battery requirements, since the current requirements at low voltage were greatly reduced and the high voltage battery was eliminated. In both tube and early transistor sets the model's control surfaces were usually operated by an electromagnetic 'escapement' controlling the stored energy in a rubber-band loop, allowing simple on/off rudder control (right, left, and neutral) and sometimes other functions such as motor speed.

Crystal-controlled superheterodyne receivers with better selectivity and stability made control equipment more capable and at lower cost. Multi-channel developments were of particular use to aircraft, which really needed a minimum of three control dimensions (yaw, pitch and motor speed), as opposed to boats, which required only two or one.

As the electronics revolution took off, single-signal channel circuit design became redundant, and instead radios provided proportionally coded signal streams which a servomechanism could interpret, using pulse-width modulation (PWM).

More recently, high-end hobby systems using pulse-code modulation (PCM) features have come on the market that provide a computerized digital data bit-stream signal to the receiving device, instead of the earlier PWM encoding type. However, even with this coding, loss of transmission during flight has become more common, in part because of the ever more wireless society. Some more modern FM-signal receivers that still use "PWM" encoding instead can, thanks to the use of more advanced computer chips in them, be made to lock onto and use the individual signal characteristics of a particular PWM-type RC transmitter's emissions alone, without needing a special "code" transmitted along with the control information as PCM encoding has always required.

In the early 21st century, 2.4 gigahertz spread spectrum RC control systems have become increasingly utilized in control of model vehicles and aircraft. Now, these 2.4 GHz systems are being made by most radio manufacturers. These radio systems range in price from a couple thousand dollars, all the way down to under US$30 for some. Some manufacturers even offer conversion kits for older digital 72 MHz or 35 MHz receivers and radios. As the emerging multitude of 2.4 GHz band spread spectrum RC systems usually use a "frequency-agile" mode of operations, like FHSS that do not stay on one set frequency any longer while in use, the older "exclusive use" provisions at model flying sites needed for VHF-band RC control systems' frequency control, for VHF-band RC systems that only used one set frequency unless serviced to change it, are not as mandatory as before.

== Modern military and aerospace applications ==
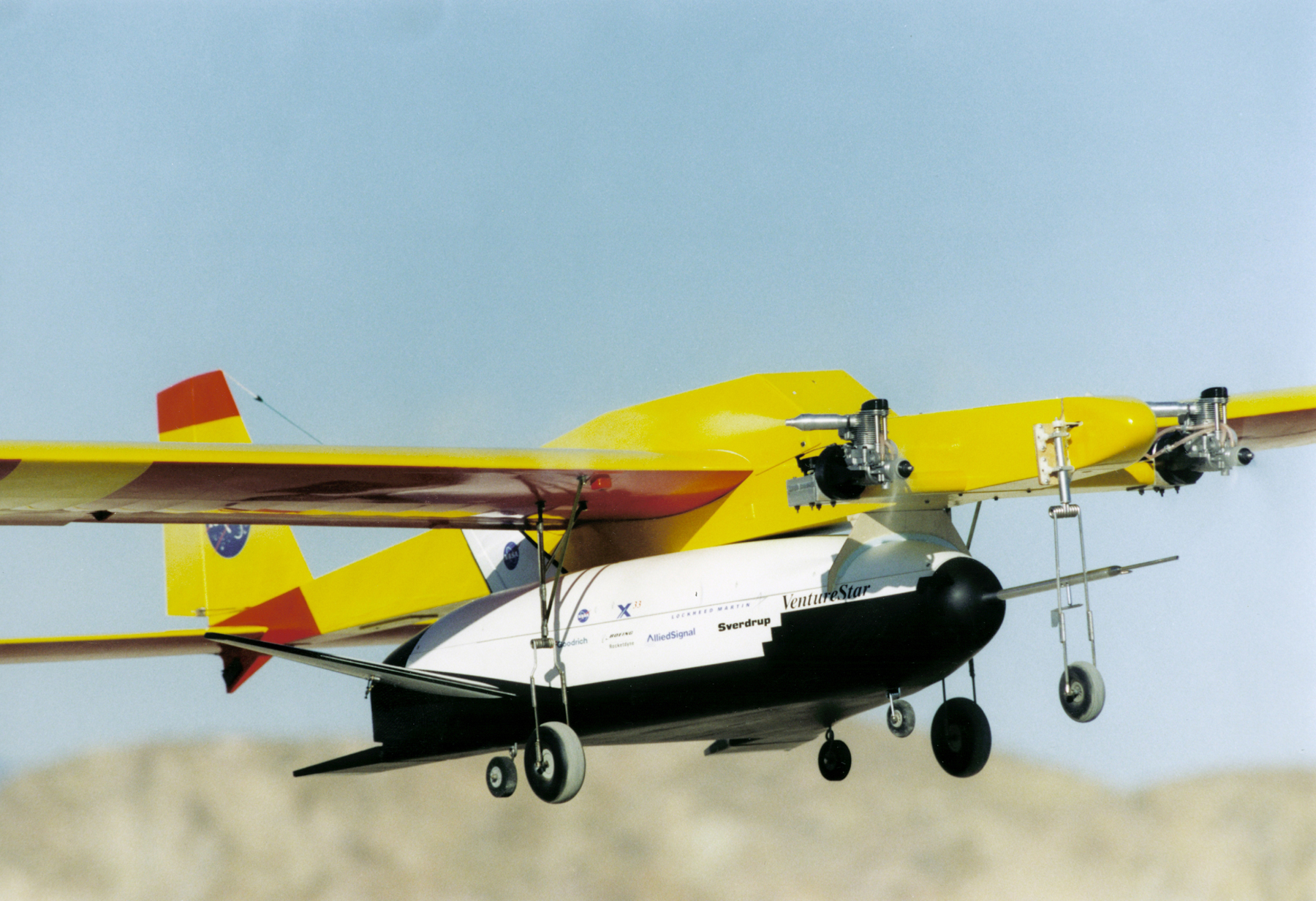
This radio-controlled airplane is carrying a scale model of Lockheed Martin X-33 and is taking part in NASA research.

Remote control military applications are typically not radio control in the direct sense, directly operating flight control surfaces and propulsion power settings, but instead take the form of instructions sent to a completely autonomous, computerized automatic pilot. Instead of a "turn left" signal that is applied until the aircraft is flying in the right direction, the system sends a single instruction that says "fly to this point".

Some of the most outstanding examples of remote radio control of a vehicle are the Mars Exploration Rovers such as Sojourner.

== Industrial radio remote control ==
Today radio control is used in industry for such devices as overhead cranes and switchyard locomotives. Radio-controlled teleoperators are used for such purposes as inspections, and special vehicles for disarming of bombs. Some remotely controlled devices are loosely called robots, but are more properly categorized as teleoperators since they do not operate autonomously, but only under control of a human operator.

An industrial radio remote control can either be operated by a person, or by a computer control system in a machine to machine (M2M) mode. For example, an automated warehouse may use a radio-controlled crane that is operated by a computer to retrieve a particular item. Industrial radio controls for some applications, such as lifting machinery, are required to be of a fail-safe design in many jurisdictions.

Industrial remote controls work differently from most consumer products. When the receiver receives the radio signal which the transmitter sent, it checks it so that it is the correct frequency and that any security codes match. Once the verification is complete, the receiver sends an instruction to a relay which is activated. The relay activates a function in the application corresponding to the transmitters button. This could be to engage an electrical directional motor in an overhead crane. In a receiver there are usually several relays, and in something as complex as an overhead crane, perhaps up to twelve or more relays are required to control all directions. In a receiver which opens a gate, two relays are often sufficient.

Industrial remote controls are getting more and higher safety requirements. For example: a remote control may not lose the safety functionality in case of malfunction. This can be avoided by using redundant relays with forced contacts.

== See also ==
- Precision-guided munition
- Radio-controlled airplane
- Radio-controlled boat
- Radio-controlled car
- Radio-controlled helicopter
- Remote control
- Remote control vehicle
- Telecommand
- Teletank
