= High performance positioning system =

Industrial Engineering method

A high performance positioning system (HPPS) is a type of positioning system consisting of a piece of electromechanics equipment (e.g. an assembly of linear stages and rotary stages) that is capable of moving an object in a three-dimensional space within a work envelope. Positioning could be done point to point or along a desired path of motion. Position is typically defined in six degrees of freedom, including linear, in an x,y,z cartesian coordinate system, and angular orientation of yaw, pitch, roll. HPPS are used in many manufacturing processes to move an object (tool or part) smoothly and accurately in six degrees of freedom, along a desired path, at a desired orientation, with high acceleration, high deceleration, high velocity and low settling time. It is designed to quickly stop its motion and accurately place the moving object at its desired final position and orientation with minimal jittering.

HPPS requires a structural characteristics of low moving mass and high stiffness. The resulting system characteristic is a high value for the lowest natural frequency of the system. High natural frequency allows the motion controller to drive the system at high servo bandwidth, which means that the HPPS can reject all motion disturbing frequencies, which act at a lower frequency than the bandwidth. For higher frequency disturbances such as floor vibration, acoustic noise, motor cogging, bearing jitter and cable carrier rattling, HPPS may employ structural composite materials for damping and isolation mounts for vibration attenuation. Unlike articulating robots, which have revolute joints that connect their links, HPPS links typically consists of sliding joints, which are relatively stiffer than revolute joints. That is the reason why high performance positioning systems are often referred to as cartesian robots.

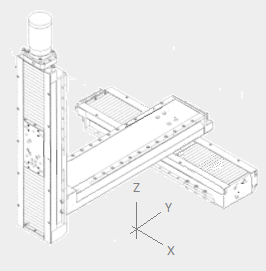
Example of custom XYZ configuration with linear motor stages for XY and a ball screw for Z

== Performance ==
HPPS, driven by linear motors, can move at a combined high velocity on order of 3-5 m/s, high accelerations of 5-7 g, at micron or sub micron positioning accuracy with settling times on order of milliseconds and servo bandwidth of 30-50 Hz. Ball screw actuators, on the other hand, have typical bandwidth of 10-20 Hz and belt driven actuators at about 5-10 Hz. The bandwidth value of HPPS is about 1/3 of the lowest natural frequency in the range of 90-150 Hz. Settling time to +/- 1% Constant Velocity, or + / - 1 um jitter, after high acceleration or high deceleration respectively, takes an estimated 3 bandwidth periods. For example, a 50 Hz servo bandwidth, having a 1 / 50 · 1000 = 20 msec period, will settle to 1 um position accuracy within an estimated 3 · 20 = 60 msec. The lowest natural frequency equals the square root of system stiffness divided by moving inertia. A typical linear recirculating bearing rail, of a high performance positioning stage, has a stiffness on order of 100-300 N/um. Such a performance is required in semiconductor process equipment, electronics assembly lines, numerically controlled machine tools, coordinate-measuring machines, 3D Printing, pick-and-place machines, drug discovery assaying and many more. At their highest performance HPPS may use granite base for thermal stability and flat surfaces, air bearings for jitter free motion, brushless linear motors for non contact, frictionless actuation, high force and low inertia, and laser interferometer for sub micron position feedback. On the other hand, a typical 6 degrees of freedom articulated robot, with 1 m' reach, has a structural stiffness on the order of 1 N/um. That is why articulated robots are best being employed as automation equipment in processes which require position repeatability on the order of 100's microns, such as robot welding, paint robots, palletizers and many more.

== History ==
The original HPPS were developed at Anorad Corporation (now Rockwell Automation) in the 1980s, after the invention of brushless linear motors by Anorad's Founder and CEO, Anwar Chitayat. Initially HPPS were used for high precision manufacturing processes in semiconductor applications such as Applied Materials, PCB Inspection Orbotech and High Velocity Machine Tool Ford. In parallel linear motor technology and their integration in HPPS, was expanded around the world. As a result, in 1996 Siemens integrated its CNC with Anorad linear motors to drive a 20 m' long Maskant machine at Boeing for chemical milling of aircraft wings. In 1997 FANUC licensed Anorad's linear motor technology and integrated it as a complete solution with their CNC products line. And in 1998, Rockwell Automation acquired Anorad to compete with Siemens and Fanuc in providing a complete linear motor solutions to drive high velocity machine tools in Automotive transfer lines. Today linear motors are being used in hundreds of thousands high performance positioning systems, which drive manufacturing processes around the world. Their market is expected to grow, according to some studies, at 4.4% a year and reach $1.5B in 2025.

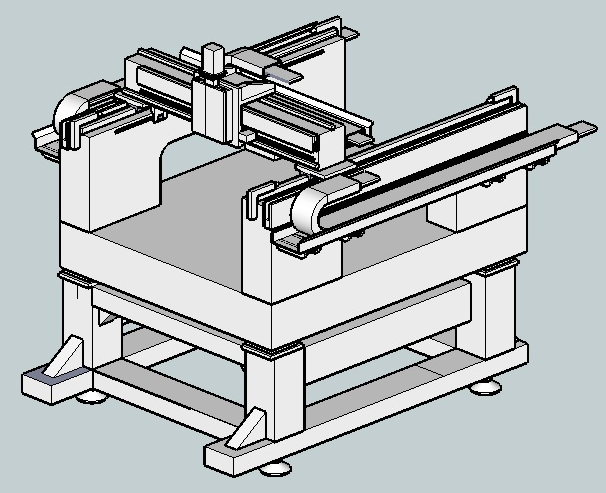
High Performance Positioning System - Gantry Type

== System requirements ==
=== Applications ===
- Semiconductors - Photolithography is a wafer (electronics) manufacturing process in semiconductor fabrication plants. It uses linear motor stages or maglev stages, for extreme positioning, to move its wafer stage.
- Electronics - Surface-mount technology is using high performance, linear motor, positioning systems to mount integrated circuit chips on printed circuit boards.
- Optics - Stereo microscopes use linear motor positioning stages for high smoothness of motion during scanning
- Machine Tools - Wire electrical discharge machining is used for cutting thick hard metals such as in Die (manufacturing). Linear motor / air bearing positioning systems provide high smoothness of motion.
- CMM - Coordinate-measuring machine often require granite base, isolation mounts, linear motor actuators, air bearing and laser interferometer.
- Lab Automation - High-throughput screening process is used in laboratory automation for drug discovery, where linear motor positioning provides high acceleration / deceleration with short settling time.

=== Specifications ===
System specification (technical standard) is an official interface between the application requirements (problem), as described by the user (customer) and the design (solution) as optimized by the developer (supplier).

- Inertia - Indicates the resistance of the moving load (tool or part) to linear (kg) and angular (kg·m2) change in velocity. To maximize natural frequency the inertia of the moving load should be minimal.
- Size - Indicates the geometrical constraints of the system's width (m), length(m) and height (m), as may be needed for handling, transport as installation.
- Motion - Indicates process cycle time (s) and process constraints for each degree of freedom, including maximum travel (m, rad), maximum velocity (m/s, rad/s) and maximum acceleration/deceleration (m/s2, rad/s2).
- Precision - Indicates linear and angular resolution of position measurement and motion (um, urad) as well as total indicator reading of accuracy and precision for each degree of freedom.
- Jitter - Indicates maximum amplitude (um) of high frequency vibrations which is allowed at stand still conditions.
- Constant velocity - Indicates the required smoothness of motion and allowed variations in (+/- %) of required constant velocity (m/s, rad/s) during motion.
- Stiffness - Indicates the resistance of position change in response to external load (N/um, N·m/rad).
- Life - indicates the expected time (hrs) or travel (km) the most active degree of freedom of the system is expected to act reliably in process operation.
- Reliability - Mean time between failures (hrs, cycles) often associated with a requirement for a Failure modes, effects, and diagnostic analysis
- Maintainability - Mean time to repair (hrs), often associated with system manuals including, operation, maintenance schedule and spare parts list.
- Environment - Indicates the expected disturbance conditions that the system may encounter during operation within its life time including Thermal, Humidity, Shock and Vibration, Cleanliness and Radiation.

=== Environment ===
- Thermal - Indicates the highest and lowest temperature (°C) that the system may endure during operation. Effects structural deformations and precision. May require cooling, insulation and low thermal conductivity material.
- Humidity - Indicated the level of water vapors in the surrounding air (%). May include the required system protection based on IP Code. May require protective seals.
- Shock (mechanics) and Vibration - Indicates the level of floor vibration and other process disturbances. May require active or passive vibration isolation mounts and structural material with high damping.
- Cleanliness - Indicates the allowable level (size and quantity per unit volume) of particles in the surrounding air. May require cleanroom operation, filtration of incoming air and protective seals.
- Radiation - Electromagnetic interference may require shielded cable management, non ferrous structural material and protective shields of the linear motor magnet plates.

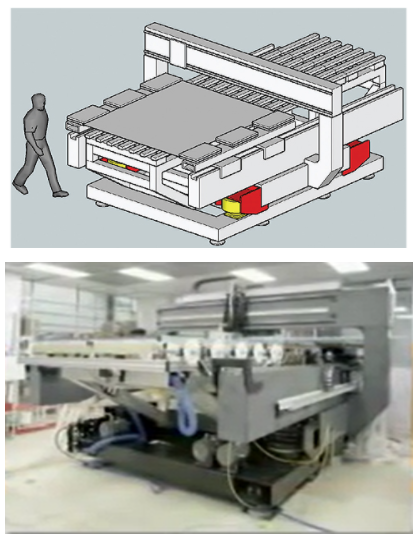
Example of high performance positioning system with a system analysis simulation model

== System solution ==
=== Configuration ===
HPPS configuration is typically optimized for maximum structural stiffness with maximum damping and minimum inertia, smallest Abbe error at the point of interest (POI), with minimum components and maximum maintainability.

- X - A single linear stage, driven by linear motor, ball screw or timing belt, is typically available as a standard actuator (aka slide, axis or table) from many suppliers.
- XYZ - A customized assembly of single stages, including moving cable management. Z axis is typically actuated with a ball screw or linear motor with a counterbalance. Axes may be separated to reduce inertia.
- XYZR - Rotational axes including pitch, yaw and roll are typically added in HPPS for orienting the end of arm tool (EOAT) or Robot end effector.
- Gantry - Gantry configuration provides maximum work envelope in XYZ configuration per given size constraints. It has 2 parallel axes for x, controlled as a single axis or master / slave. Ideal for transfer lines.
- Rotary (pitch, yaw, roll) - Rotary stages may be customized with linear stage at various order to best meet the specifications. They are typically using direct-drive mechanism, analogous to linear motors.
- Custom - Custom configurations of HPPS may be required in the mathematical optimization process of integrating the best system components into the most compact, and responsive system.

=== System analysis ===
System analysis is a process of understanding the relationships between design parameters, operating conditions, environmental variables and system performance based on system modeling and analysis tools

- Dynamics (mechanics) - Optimizing linear motion and rotational profiles, dynamic accuracy, bearing loads, and motor power, using analysis tools such as MATLAB, Simulink, Mathcad, Microsoft Excel
- Vibration analysis - Estimating natural frequency, servo bandwidth, settling times, using analysis tools such as MATLAB, Simulink, Mathcad, Microsoft Excel
- Accuracy and precision - Estimating 3D static errors at the point of interest as a function of axes straightness, flatness, pitch, yaw, roll, wobble and ran-outs using analysis tools such as Mathcad, Microsoft Excel
- Strength of materials - Estimating stiffness of axes, frames, supports and mounting structures, using Finite element method tools such as AutoCAD, Nastran
- Thermal expansion - Predicting thermal expansions and optimizing heat transfer using insulation and cooling, using analysis tools such as AutoCAD, Nastran
- Fluid dynamics - Estimating flow rates and supply pressures for fluid actuators and cooling using analysis tools such as Computational fluid dynamics
- Servo control - Estimating required filters and tuning parameters for PID controller loops of system axes using analysis tools such as MATLAB, Simulink
- Reliability engineering - Estimating system mean time between failures using analysis tools such as Mathcad, Microsoft Excel

=== Component sizing ===
Component sizing is the process of selecting standard parts from component suppliers, or designing a custom part for manufacturing

- Frame - Typically made of aluminum or steel weldments of hollow tubes, possibly filled in with concrete composite for damping. Mounted on leveling pads and secured to floor possibly with earthquake posts.
- Actuator
  - slide, base - High precision bases use granite for flatness and thermal stability. Lower precision standard stages use extruded aluminum. Custom stages typically use ribbed aluminum or stainless steel machined for low inertia high stiffness.
  - bearing - Options include cross roller bearing for relatively short travel, recirculating bearing for higher stiffness longer travel and air bearing with granite base for high smoothness of motion, higher precision.
  - servo motor - Typically linear brushless DC electric motor for horizontal axes with 3 phase synchronized current in moving coil and field in stationary, low cogging, magnet plates. For vertical linear motor axes a counterbalance may be used. Rotary stages use similar 2 parts, direct drive motor, including a stationary coil armature and a moving magnetic rotor.
  - feedback - Typically high resolution encoder, optical, magnetic or captative, analog or digital, linear or rotary, absolute or Incremental encoder with index mark for homing. Laser interferometry for long travel, sub-micron precision.
  - forcer - Forcer options include ball screw for high force, rack and pinion for long travel and timing belt drive for high velocity. Their limitations in HPPS is friction, jitter, backlash, lower stiffness and maintenance.
- cable management - For power and signal transmission. The weakest link of the system reliability chain. Lower bend radius for low profile increases fatigue. Requires cable carrier or using flat ribbon cable. Introduce jitter.
- Accessories - Hard stops, stiffening brackets, bellows, shock mounts, air cooling fans, limits, flexures, robot end effector grippers, machine vision camera and sensors for Artificial Intelligence, Machine learning, monitoring such as accelerometers, temperature sensors and gyroscopes.
- servo drive - Amplifying motion control signals to drive servo motors. Ranging from low power to 10s KW. For example, 40 KW in driving high force linear motor of 10,000 N moving at 4 m/s. DC voltage ranges from a safe 24V/48V to over 400 V. High current loop update rates, of motor signals, are on order of thousands of Hz. Popular network communication with motion controller is via EtherCAT.
- Motion PID controller - Options include computer numerical control (CNC), single axis, multi axis, PC based, stand alone or integrated with servo drive and /or PLC, including I/O, auto tuning, diagnostic and programming available from multiple sources.
- Programmable logic controller (PLC) - Higher layer in the hierarchical control system for process sequence control, provided by many suppliers.

=== System testing ===
System testing is an iterative process of system development, intended to validate system analysis modeling, proof of concepts, safety factor of performance specifications and acceptant testing.

- Motion travel, maximum velocity, maximum acceleration, jerk - Commonly provided within the motion controller.
- Linear accuracy, repeatability, flatness, straightness, yaw, pitch - Laser interferometer.
- Angular accuracy, repeatability, runout, wobble - Autocollimator.
- Cycle time, settling time, jitter, constant velocity - Commonly provided within the motion controller.
- Thermal stability - Temperature sensors mounted at multiple location to observe heat transfer.
- Inertia, stiffness - scales, dial indicators and force gauge.
- Natural frequency, servo bandwidth - Commonly provided with motion controller which has frequency response tools.
- Mean time between failure, Life test - Non stop operation for specified period without a failure in extreme operating conditions under continuous monitoring with frequent visual and sensor checking.
