= Gas chromatography–vacuum ultraviolet spectroscopy =

Universal detection technique for gas chromatography

Gas chromatography–vacuum ultraviolet spectroscopy (GC-VUV) is a universal detection technique for gas chromatography. VUV detection provides both qualitative and quantitative spectral information for most gas phase compounds.

GC-VUV spectral data is three-dimensional (time, absorbance, wavelength) and specific to chemical structure. Nearly all compounds absorb in the vacuum ultraviolet region of the electromagnetic spectrum with the exception of carrier gases hydrogen, helium, and argon. The high energy, short wavelength VUV photons probe electronic transitions in almost all chemical bonds including ground state to excited state. The result is spectral "fingerprints" that are specific to individual compound structure and can be readily identified by the VUV library.

Unique VUV spectra enable closely related compounds such as structural isomers to be clearly differentiated. VUV detectors complement mass spectrometry, which struggles with characterizing constitutional isomers and compounds with low mass quantitation ions. VUV spectra can also be used to deconvolve analyte co-elution, resulting in an accurate quantitative representation of individual analyte contribution to the original response. This characteristically lends itself to significantly reducing GC runtimes through flow rate-enhanced chromatographic compression.

VUV spectroscopy follows the simple linear relationship between absorbance and concentration described by the Beer–Lambert Law, resulting in more accurate retention time-based identification. VUV absorbance spectra also exhibit feature similarity within compound classes, meaning VUV detectors can rapidly compound class characterization in complex samples through compound spectral shape and retention index information. Advances in technology reduces the typical group analysis data processing time from 15 to 30 minutes to <1 minute per sample.

== History ==
The first benchtop detector was introduced in 2014 with detection capabilities between 120 and 240 nm. This portion of the ultraviolet spectrum had historically been restricted to bright source synchrotron facilities due to significant background absorption challenges inherent to working within the wavelength range. Further detector platform development has extended the wavelength detection range out from 120 to 430 nm.

== How it works ==
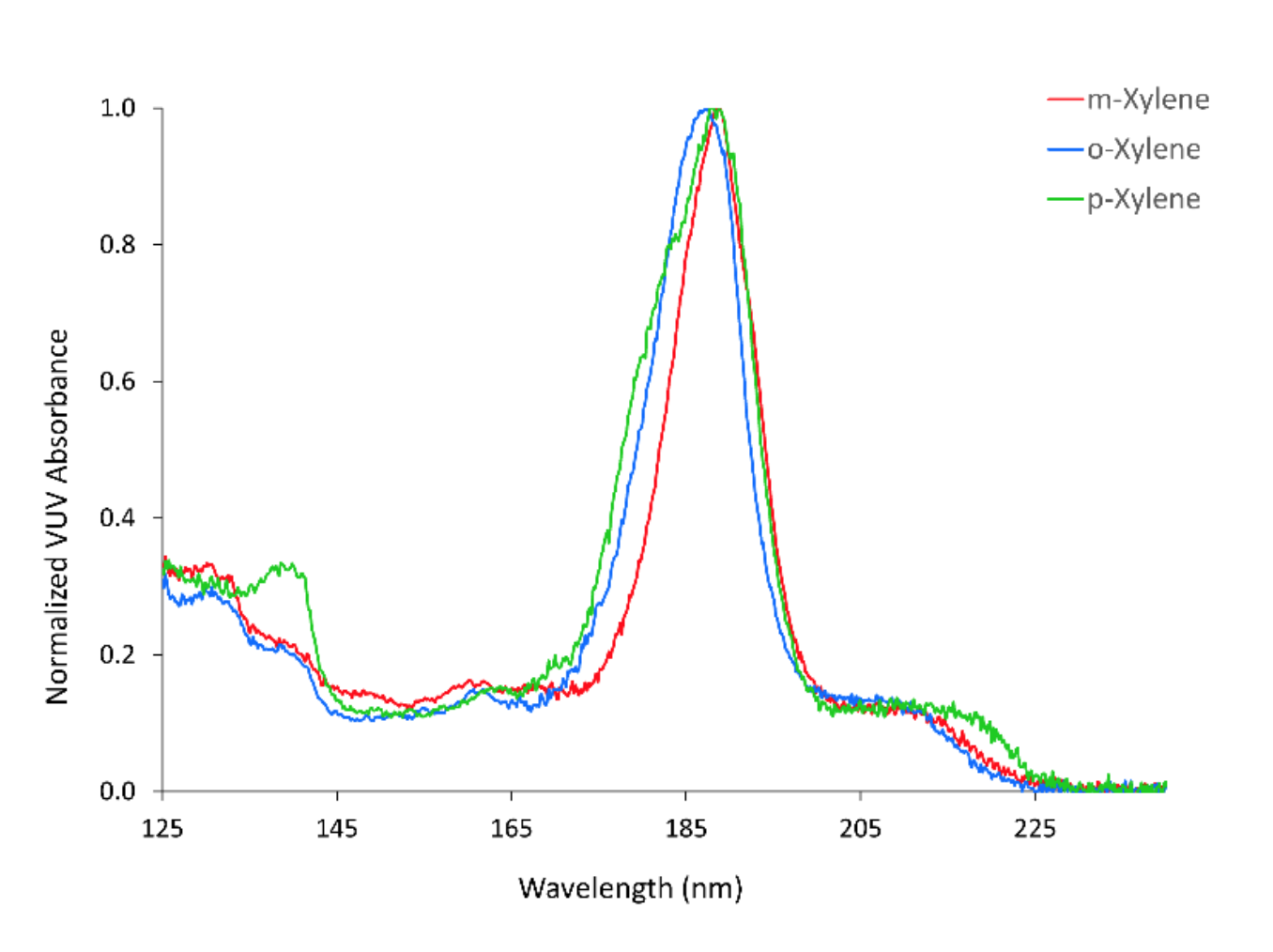
The distinct VUV spectra of m-, p-, and o-xylene. The compounds differ by only the positions of two methyl groups on a benzene ring.

=== VUV detectors for gas chromatography detectors ===
VUV detectors are compatible with most gas chromatography (GC) manufacturers. The detectors can be connected through a heated transfer line inserted through a punch-out in the GC oven casing. A makeup flow of carrier gas is introduced at the end of the transfer line. Analytes arrive in the flow cell and are exposed to VUV light from a deuterium lamp. Specially coated reflective optics paired with a back-thinned charge-coupled device (CCD) enable the collection of high-quality VUV absorption data. Figure 1 shows a schematic of the analyte path from GC to VUV detector.

=== VUV spectral identification ===
Gas phase species absorb and display unique spectra between 120 and 240 nm where high energy σ→σ*, n→σ*, π→π*, n → π* electronic transitions can be excited and probed. VUV spectra reflect the absorbance cross section of compounds and are specific to their electronic structure and functional group arrangement. The ability of VUV detectors to produce spectra for most compounds results in universal and highly selective compound identification. VUV spectroscopy data is highly characteristic while also providing quantitative information. Many commonly used GC detectors such as the electron capture detector (ECD), flame ionization detector (FID), and thermal conductivity detector (TCD) produce quantitative but not qualitative detail. Gas chromatography–mass spectrometry (GC-MS) generates qualitative and quantitative data but has difficulty characterizing labile and low mass compounds, as well as differentiating between isomers. GC-VUV complements MS by overcoming its limitations and providing a secondary method of confirmation. It also offers a single-instrument alternative to the use of multiple detectors for qualitative and quantitative analysis.

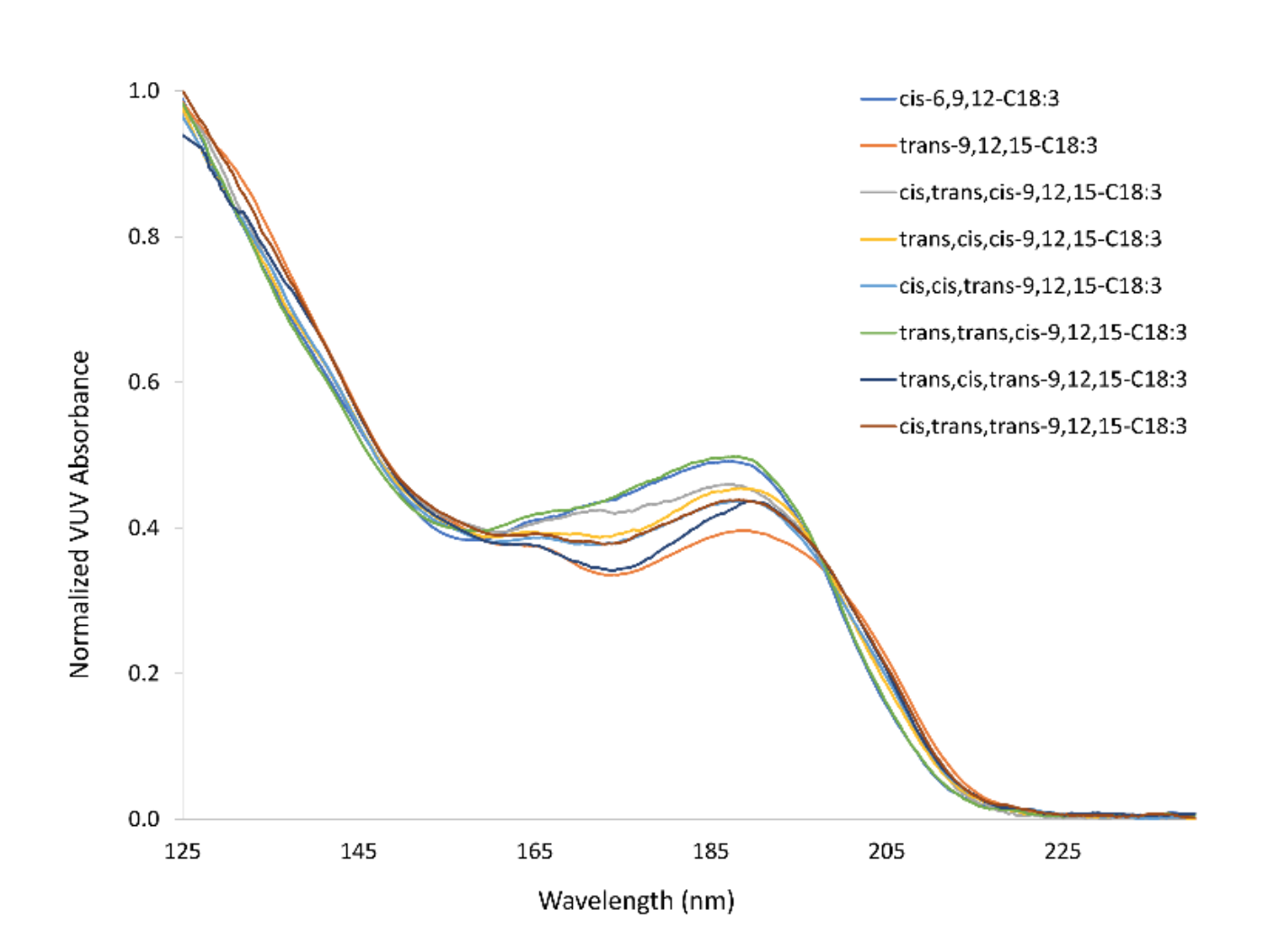
VUV spectra of fatty acid methyl ester (FAME) cis and trans isomers that are commonly found in butter and vegetable oils. GC-VUV can readily distinguish between the C18:3 FAME isomers, cis and trans classification, and the degree of unsaturation.

Naphthols, xylenes, and cis- and trans- fatty acids are compounds that are prohibitively difficult to distinguish according to their electron ionization mass spectral profiles. Xylenes present the additional challenge of natural co-elution that makes separating their isoforms problematic. Figure 2 shows the distinct VUV spectra of m-, p-, and o-xylene. These compounds can be differentiated despite their only difference being the position of two methyl groups around a benzene ring. The spectral differences of these isomers enable their co-elution to be resolved through spectral deconvolution.

Fatty acid screening and profiling is an application that commonly requires the use of multiple detectors to achieve quantitative and qualitative results. FID is a quantitative detector that is suitable for routine screening when guided by retention index information. GC-MS has traditionally been used for qualitative compound profiling, but falls short where isobaric analytes are prevalent. It especially struggles with differentiating cis and trans fatty acid isomers. Electron impact ionization can also cause double bond migration and lead to ambiguous fatty acid structural data.

Determining cis and trans fatty acid distribution in oils and fats is important in assessing their potential health impacts. VUV spectra of trans-containing fatty acid methyl ester (FAME) isomers typically found in butter and vegetable oils are shown in Figure 3. These trans-containing isomers separate chromatographically from cis-containing isomers and have the tendency to co-elute with each other and, in some cases, with select C20:1 isomers. GC-VUV is not only able to differentiate the C18:3 FAME variants, but is also capable of telling cis isomers apart from trans isomers. Degrees of unsaturation such as C20:1 vs. C18:3 can additionally be distinguished. Previous work has demonstrated how distinct VUV spectra enable straightforward deconvolution and accurate quantitation of cis and trans FAME isomers.

=== Chromatographic compression and spectral deconvolution ===
Unique VUV absorbance spectra not only enable unambiguous compound identification, and allows GC run times to be deliberately shortened. VUV detectors operate at ambient pressure and are thus not flow rate limited. GC run times can be reduced by increasing the GC column flow and oven temperature program rates.

Flow rate-enhanced chromatographic compression utilizes VUV spectral deconvolution to resolve any co-elution that may result from shortening GC runtimes. VUV absorption is additive, meaning that overlapping peaks give a spectrum that corresponds to the sum absorbance of each compound. The individual contribution of each analyte can be determined if the VUV spectra for co-eluting compounds are stored in the VUV library. The ability to differentiate coeluting analyte spectra and use them to deconvolve the overlapping signals is demonstrated in Figure 4. The individual spectra of terpenes limonene and p-cymene are shown in Panel A along with the summed absorbance of the selected retention time window (blue region in Panel B) and the fit with VUV library spectra. The R^{2} >0.999 fit result confirms their identities, and enables the deconvolution of these and other terpenes analyzed by GC-VUV as featured in Panel B.

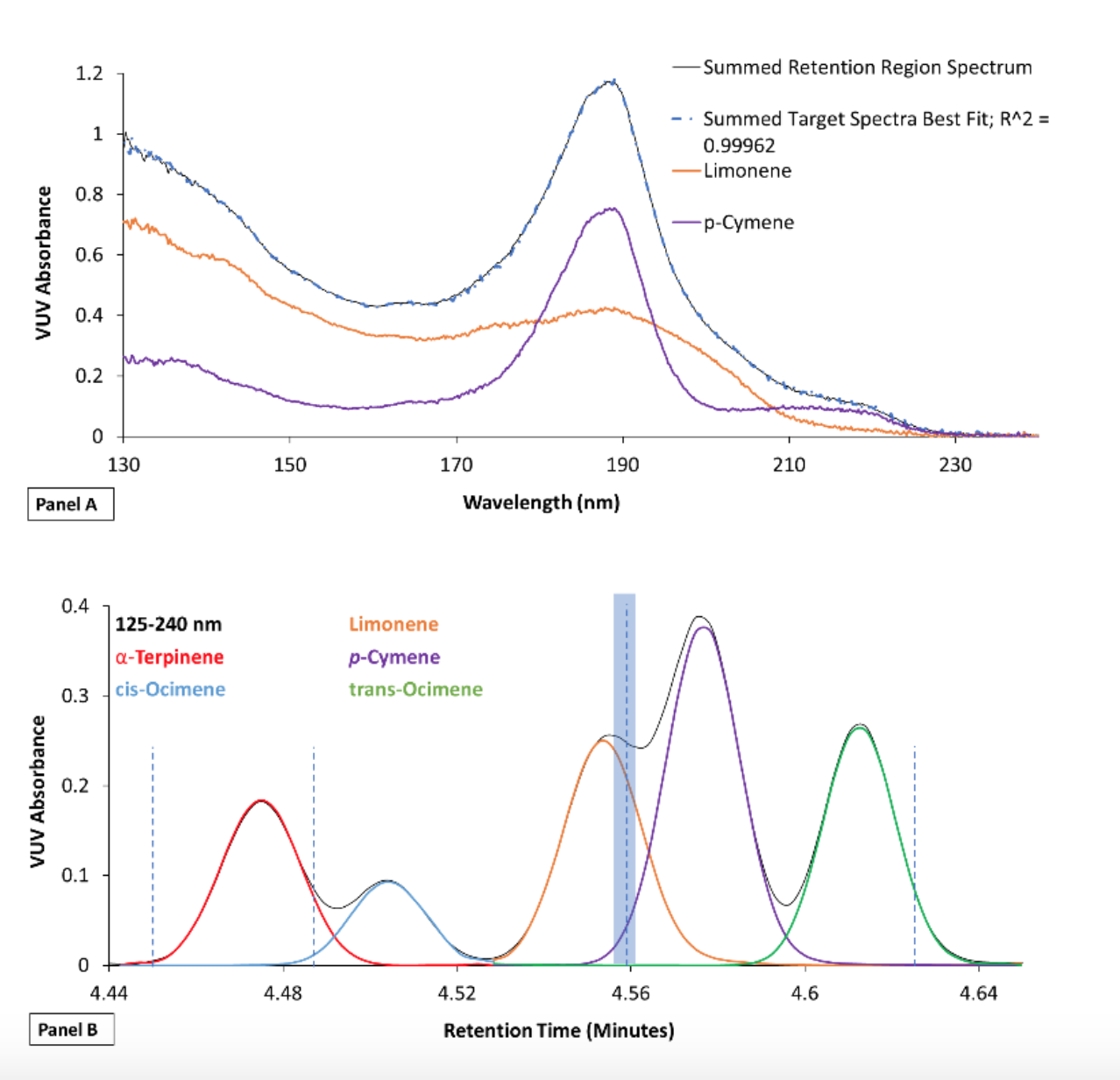
Panel A shows the individual spectra of limonene and p-cymene along with the summed absorbance of the selected retention time (blue region in Panel B) and the fit with VUV library spectra. The deconvolution of these and other terpenes analyzed by fast GC-VUV is featured in Panel B.

Testing for the presence of residual solvents in Active Pharmaceutical Ingredients (APIs) is critical for patient safety and commonly follows United States Pharmacopeia (USP) Method <467> guidelines, or more broadly, International Council for Harmonisation (ICH) Guideline Q3C(R6). The gas chromatography (GC) runtime suggested by USP Method 467 is approximately 60 min. A generic method for residual solvent analysis by GC-MS describes conditions that include a runtime of approximately 30 minutes. A GC-VUV and static headspace method was developed using a chromatographic compression strategy that resulted in a GC runtime of 8 minutes. The GC-VUV method uses a flow rate of 4 mL/min and an oven ramp of 35 °C (held for 1 min), followed by an increase to 245 °C at a rate of 30 °C/min.

Figure 5 compares the results when the general conditions of the GC-MS method were followed against the GC-VUV method run with Class 2 residual solvents. Tetralin eluted at approximately 35 minutes using the GC-MS method conditions, whereas the analyte had a retention time of less than 7 minutes when the GC-VUV method was applied. The co-elution of m- and p-xylene occurred in both GC-MS and GC-VUV method runs. VUV software matched the analyte absorbance of both isomers with VUV library spectra (Figure 2) to deconvolve the overlapping signals as displayed in Figure 6. Goodness of fit information ensures that the correct compound assignment takes place during the post-run data analysis.

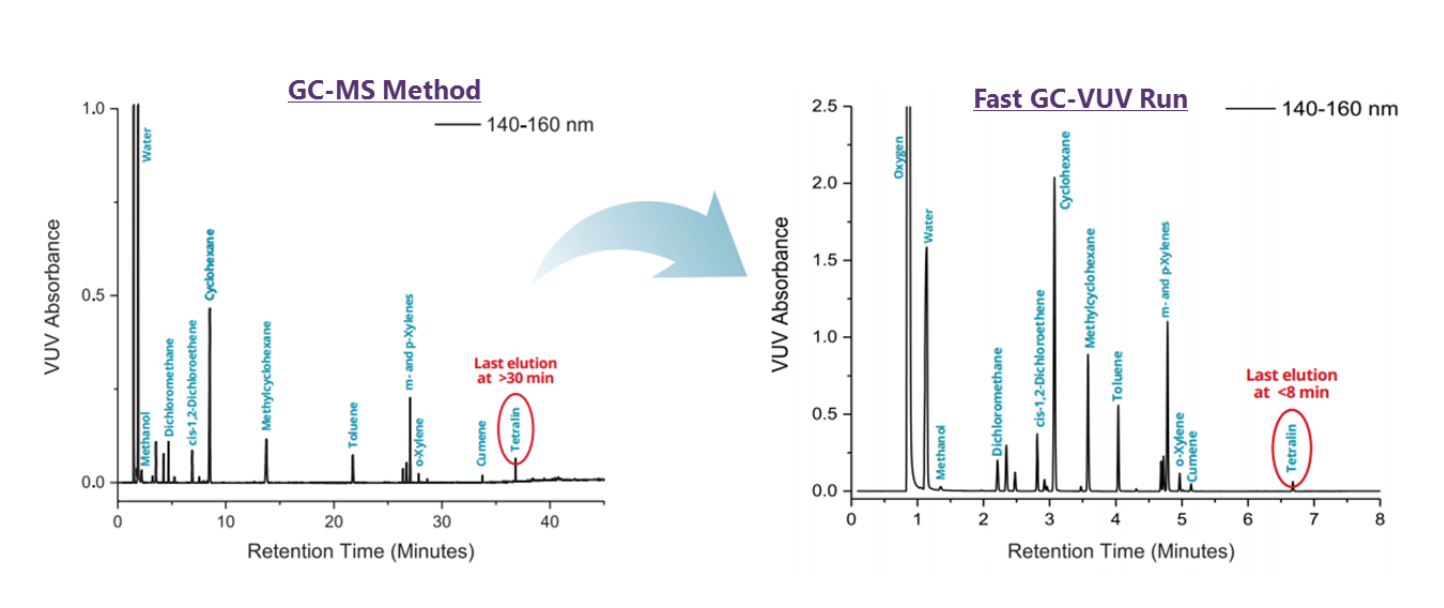
Comparison of legacy GC-MS and fast GC-VUV method runtimes for residual solvent analysis. Tetralin elutes at >30 minutes using the GC-MS method conditions, whereas the fast GC-VUV method elutes at <7 minutes.

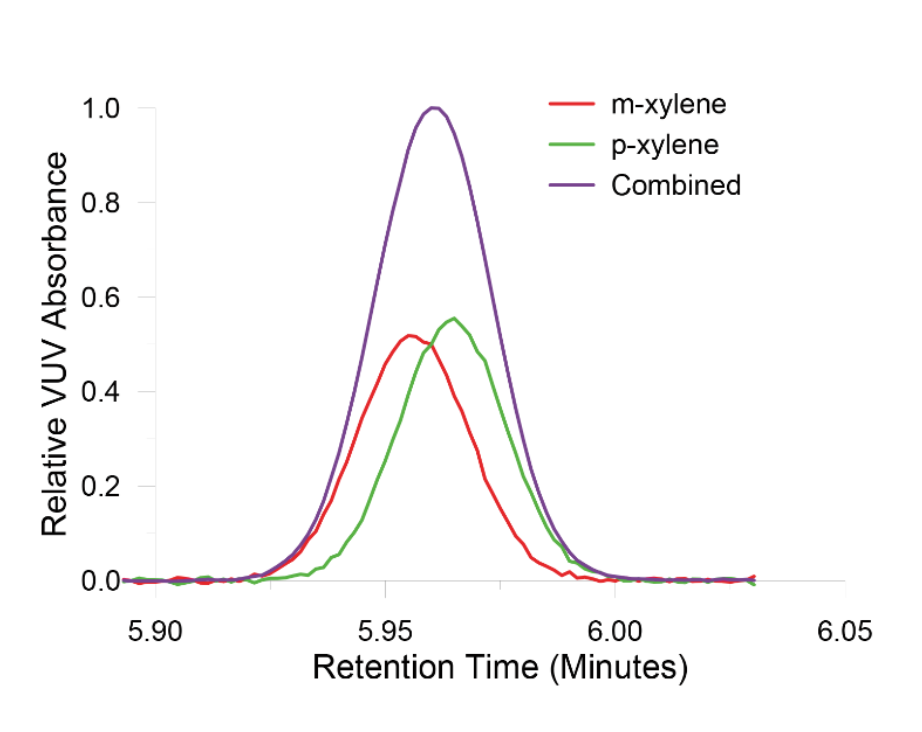
The deconvolution of m- and p-xylene co-elution. The relative contribution of each analyte is shown relative to the sum absorbance.

The flow rate-enhanced chromatographic compression strategy has been applied to a diverse set of applications since the development of the GC-VUV method for residual solvents analysis. The fast GC-VUV approach reduced GC runtimes for terpene analysis from 30 minutes to 9 minutes (the deconvolution of monoterpene isomers is shown in Figure 4). It has also been demonstrated that GC runtimes as short as 14 minutes can be used for PIONA compound analysis of gasoline samples. Typical GC separation times range between 1 – 2 hours using alternative methods.

=== Compound class characterization ===
GC-VUV can be used for bulk compositional analysis because compounds share spectral shape characteristics within a class. Proprietary software applies fitting procedures to quickly determine the relative contribution of each compound category present in a sample. Retention index information is used to limit the amount of VUV library searching and fitting performed for each analyte, enabling the automated data processing routine to be completed quickly. Compound class or specific compound concentrations can be reported as either mass or volume percent.

GC-VUV bulk compound characterization was first applied to the analysis of paraffin, isoparaffin, olefin, naphthene, and aromatic (PIONA) hydrocarbons in gasoline streams. It is suitable for use with finished gasoline, reformate, reformer feed, FCC, light naphtha, and heavy naphtha samples. A typical chromatographic analysis is displayed in Figure 7. The inset shows how the analyte spectral response is fit with VUV library spectra for the selected time slice. A report detailing the carbon number breakdown within each PIONA compound class, as well as the relative mass or volume percent of classes, is shown. A table with mass % and carbon number data from a gasoline sample can be seen in Figure 8. Compound class characterization utilizes a method known as time interval deconvolution (TID), which has recently been applied to the analysis of terpenes.

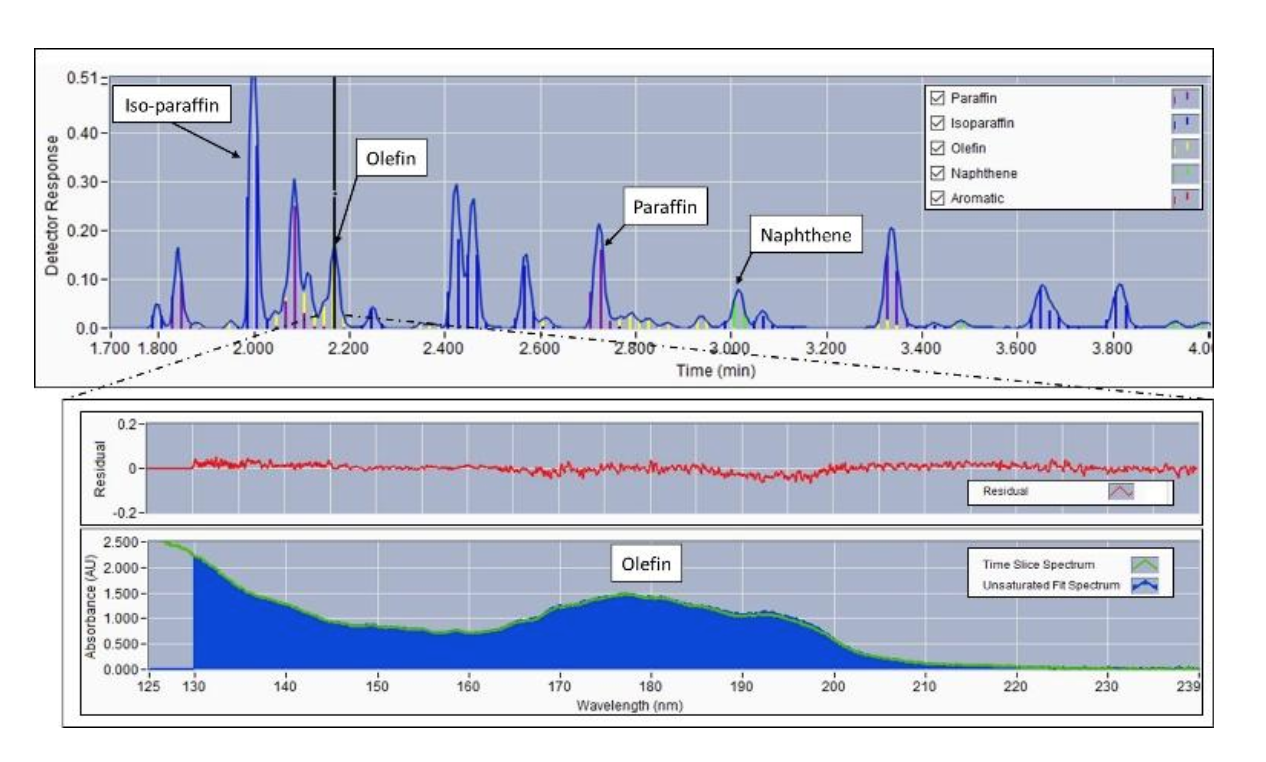
Zoomed-in chromatogram of gasoline sample with key PIONA compound class representative peaks labeled. Inset figure shows analyte spectral features fit with VUV library olefin compound class spectral response information. The residual fit statistical data indicating a good fit is also shown.

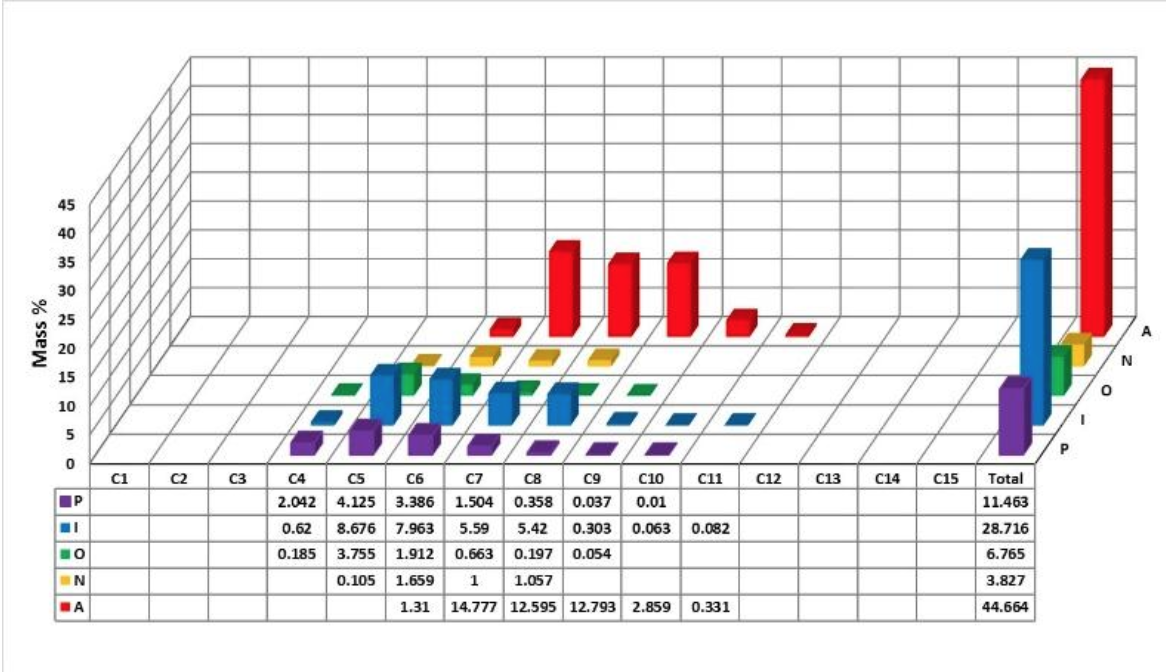
Compositional analysis of gasoline sample run using ASTM D8071. Carbon number and mass % or volume % composition of PIONA compounds are reported by VUV Analyze automated software.
