= Heat storage =

Articles on heat storage include:

- Energy storage
- Thermal energy storage
  - Hot water storage tank
- Seasonal thermal energy storage (STES)
- Storage heater
- Steam accumulator
- Fireless locomotive
