= Floating floor =

Floor not attached to the subfloor

Detail of floating floor over concrete.

Detail of floating floor over joists.

A floating floor is a floor that does not need to be nailed or glued to the subfloor. The term floating floor refers to the installation method, but is often used synonymously with laminate flooring. It is applied now to other coverings such as floating tile systems and vinyl flooring in a domestic context.

A floating floor is a type of flooring installation method where the individual floorboards or tiles are not directly attached to the sub-floor. Instead, they are laid over a thin underlayment or foam padding, allowing them to "float" above the sub-floor.

A sprung floor is a special type of floating floor designed to enhance sports or dance performance. In general though the term refers to a floor used to reduce noise or vibration.

A domestic floating floor might be constructed over a subfloor or even over an existing floor. It can consist of a glass fibre, felt or cork layer for sound insulation with neoprene pads holding up a laminate floor. There is a gap between the floating floor and the walls to decouple them and allow for expansion; this gap is covered with skirting boards or mouldings.

Floating floors as used in sound studios can be either just larger versions of the domestic variety, or much larger constructions with slabs of concrete to keep the resonance frequency down. The manufacture of integrated circuits uses massive floating floors with hundreds of tons in weight of concrete to avoid vibration affecting mask alignment.

Floating floors are one of the requirements for the THX high-fidelity sound reproduction standard for movie theaters, screening rooms, home theaters, computer speakers, gaming consoles, and car audio systems.

While floating floors add to the appeal of a home, they are not recommended for areas that may get wet, i.e. bathrooms and near exterior doors.

== See also ==
- Flooring
- Floor vibration
- Vibration isolation
