= Boaz Eidelberg =

Israeli inventor

Boaz Eidelberg, Ph.D. (Hebrew: בעז אידלברג) (born March 16, 1944) is an inventor of multiple patents in robotics and high performance positioning systems, including their mechatronics system analysis tools for design optimization.

== Academic education ==
- 1968 - B.Sc. Mechanical Engineering, Tri State College (now Trine University)
- 1970 - M.Sc. Machine Design and Metallurgy, Michigan State University.
- 1975 - Ph.D. Mechanical System analysis, Machine control and Strength of Materials, Cornell University

== Professional career ==
- Rafael

1975-1992 - Rafael Advanced Defense Systems including Galram (now RDC) where he patented an aerodynamic robot end effector.

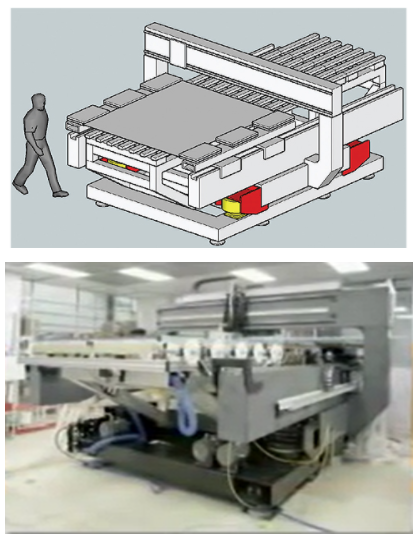
Example of high performance positioning system with a system analysis simulation model

- Anorad (Rockwell)

1990 - Anorad Corporation, Director of Linear Motor Business development. Promoting Linear Motor technology including Siemens for Boeing's Chemical milling process of aircraft wings. Led linear motor technology transfer to FANUC. Initiated Anorad's acquisition by Rockwell Automation

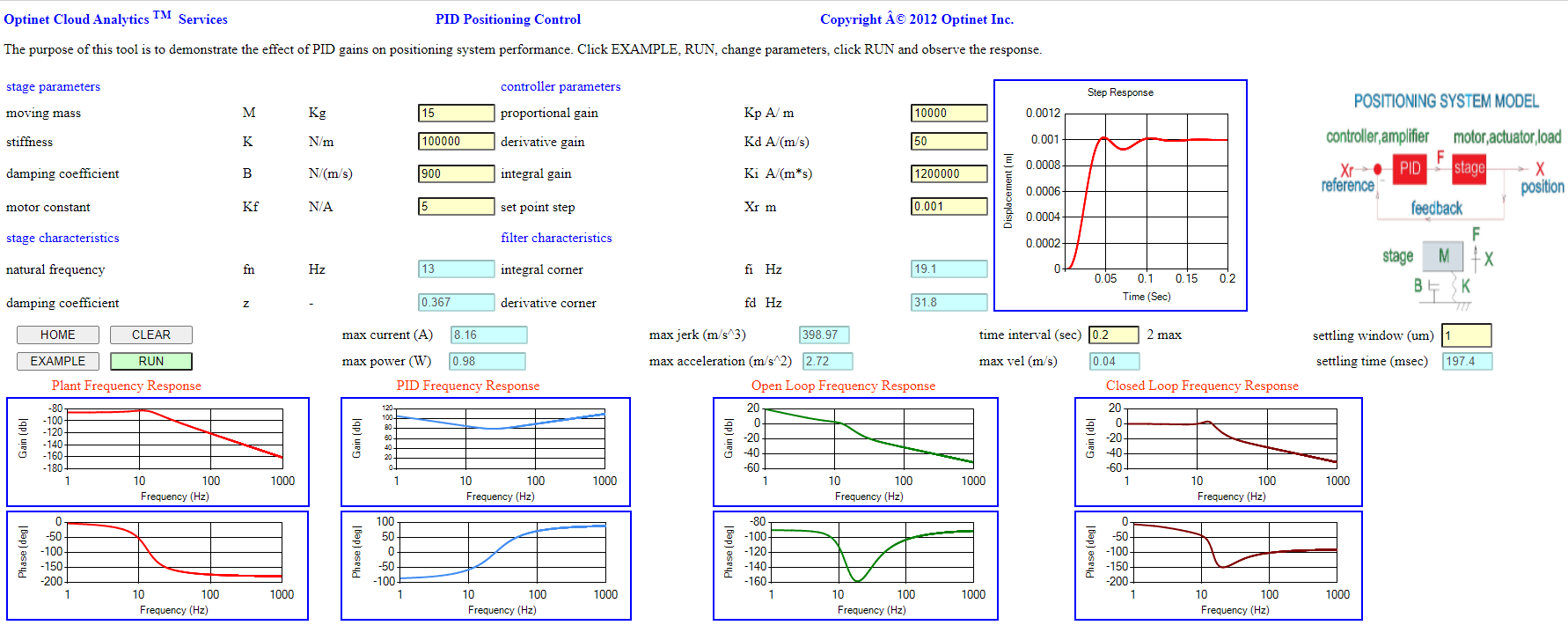
Example of a free online system analysis tool for high performance positioning system controller

- Botec / Bayside (Parker)

2001- Bayside, Vice President Business Development for Applied Materials and others. A machine, 6x3x2m, which was patented by Eidelberg for large virtual rotations of incoming glass panels, partially motivated Parker Hannifin to acquire Bayside. Patented a robot for Goodyear's wire filament winding process in next generation tire manufacturing.

- Festo

2012 - Festo, head of NAFTA Competence Center. Patented for food and beverage and laboratory automation companies, a variable pitch gripper for robots, which allows bottle handling of various sizes, reducing time loss during an end of arm tool change. For automotive manufacturers, Eidelberg invented an ”all in one” Robotic gripper, using a single standard positioning stage, which could be assembled in hundreds of XYZ configurations and grip multiple body parts without losing time for gripper changes. The invention led Festo Esslingen file the patent with Cooperative Patent Classification and International Patent Classification.

- Optinet

Founded Optinet in 2004 including consulting activities and academic teaching. Developed free online lectures and system analysis tools to introduce viewers to high performance positioning systems.

== Academic career ==
Developed and taught distance learning courses in Robotics, Finite Element Methods and Manufacturing Technology at Farmingdale State College. Developed and taught a distance learning graduate course in Mechatronics with Artificial Intelligence and Machine Learning features at Stony Brook University. For these courses he developed over 100 online tutorials and lectures.

== Personal life ==
Born in 1944 to Joseph and Zipora Eidelberg in Mandatory Palestine (now Israel). Graduated in 1962 from Haifa military academy (Hebrew: פנימיה צבאית, חיפה) near the Hebrew Reali School. His father was a military officer, plant manager and a Biblical history researcher of The Exodus and the Ten Lost Tribes of Israel. His son Tal is a computer science entrepreneur. Eidelberg holds a private pilot license and encountered an emergency landing in 2013
