= Andrew Betts Brown =

Scottish engineer and inventor

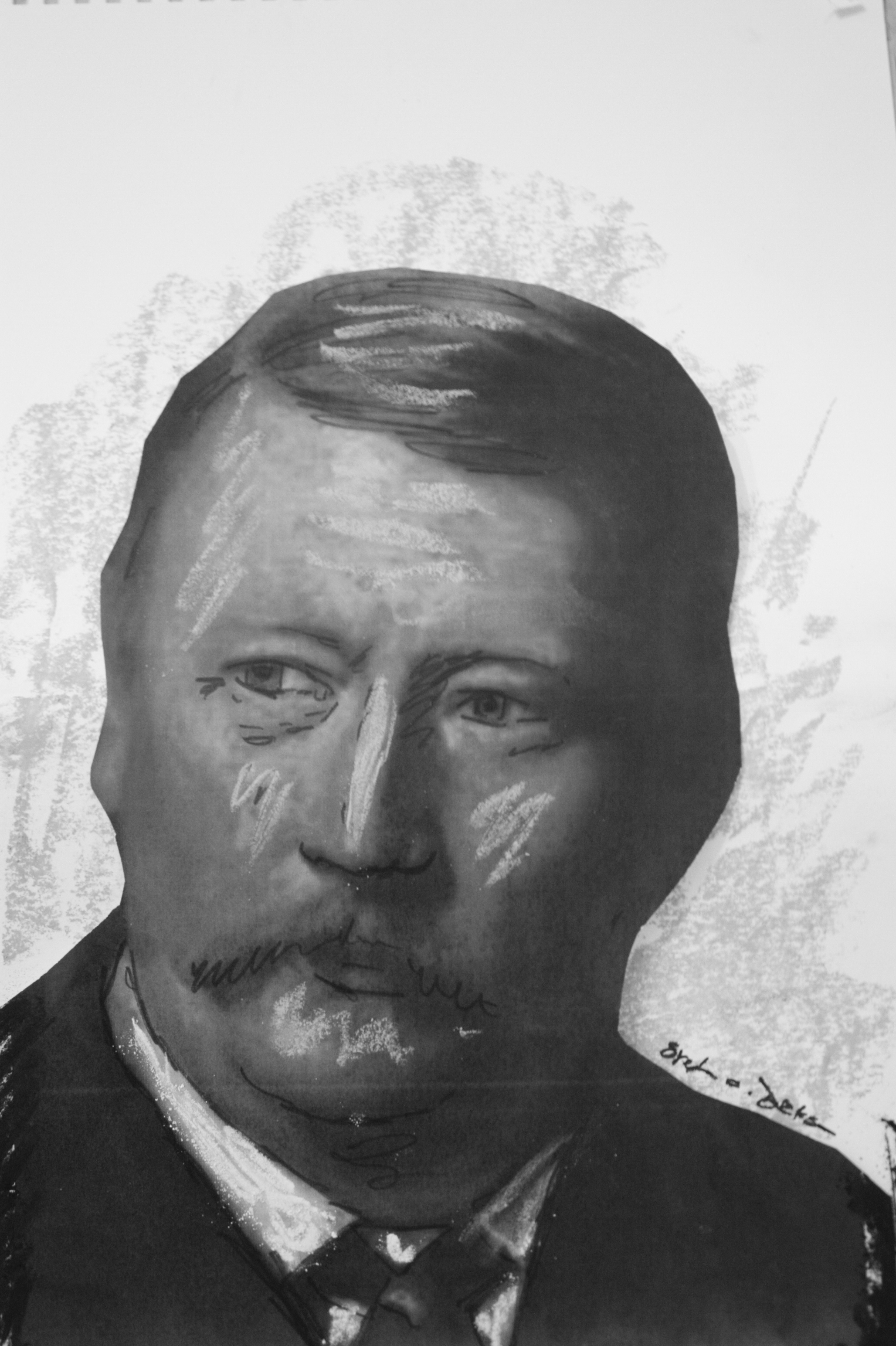
Andrew Betts Brown

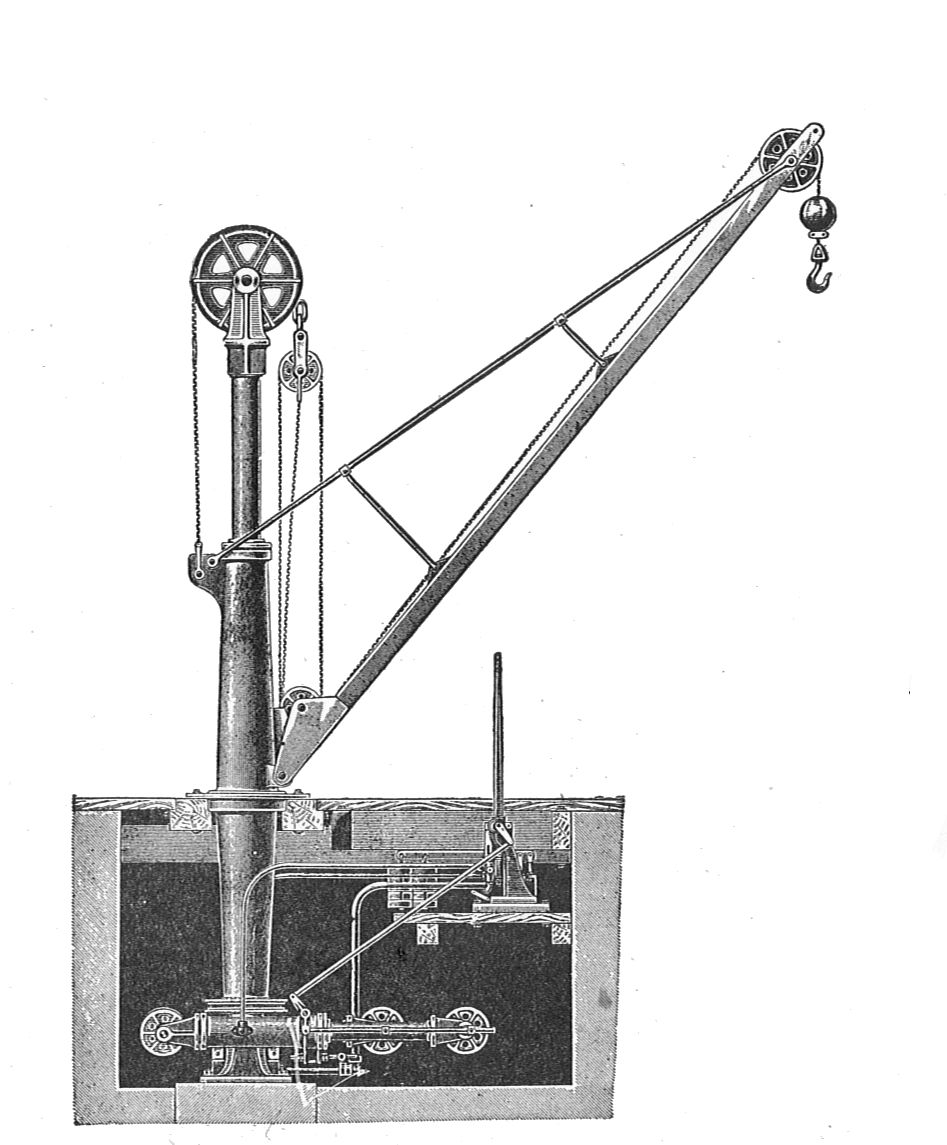
Diagram of a Hydraulic Crane

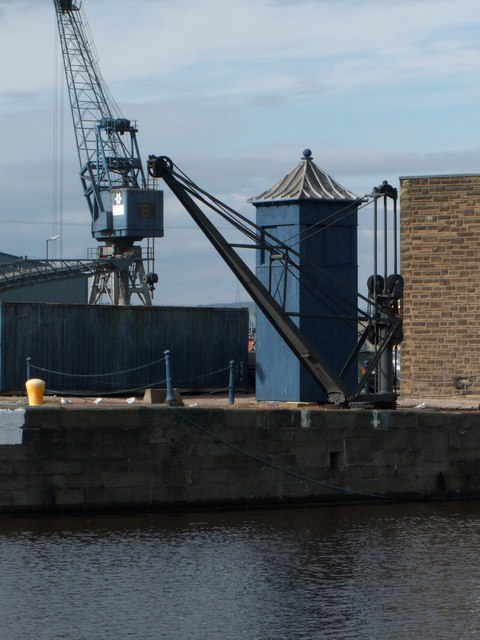
Bett Brown’s Hydraulic Crane, at the Albert Dock, Leith

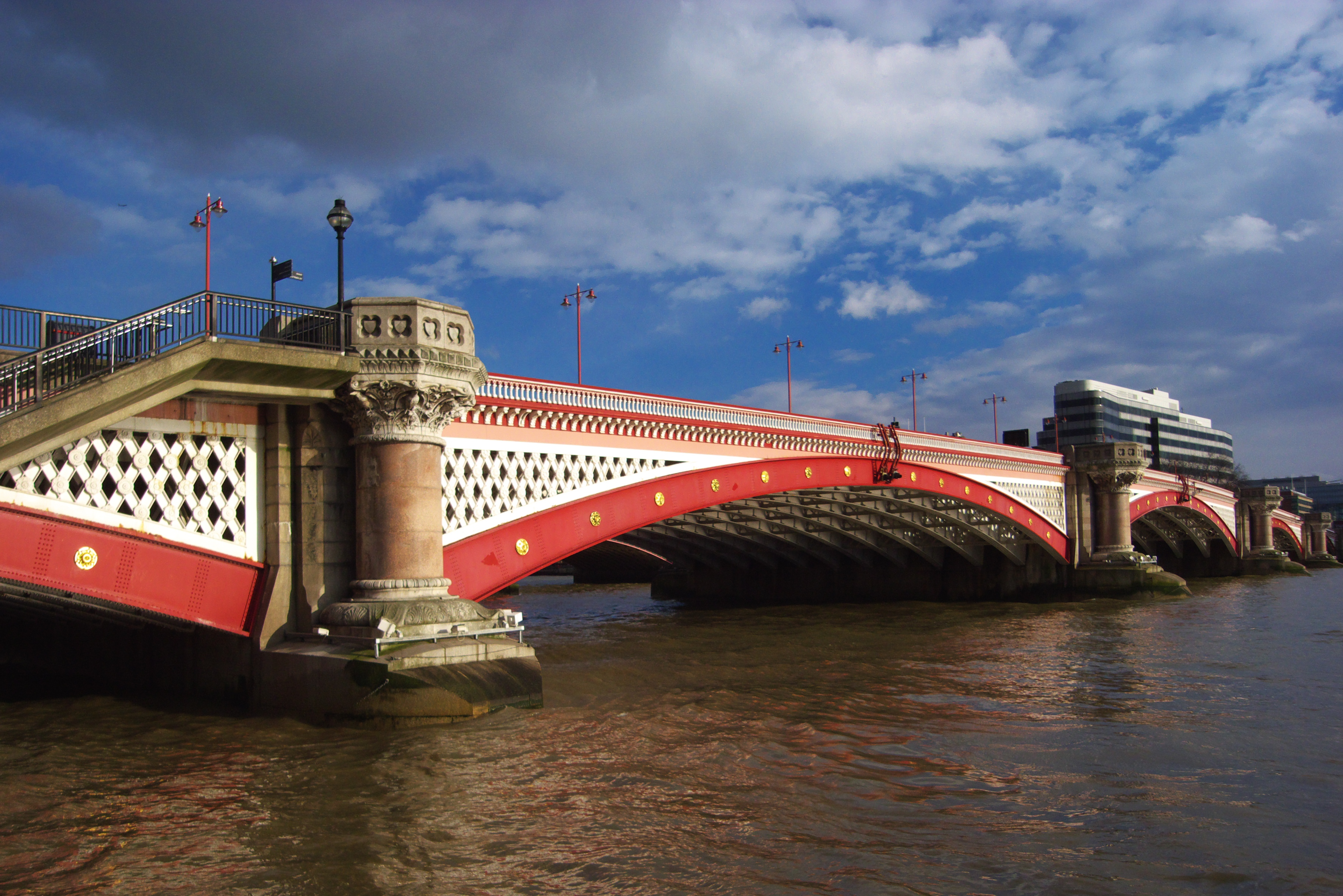
Blackfriars Bridge, London was built with Brown’s newly invented overhead travelling crane

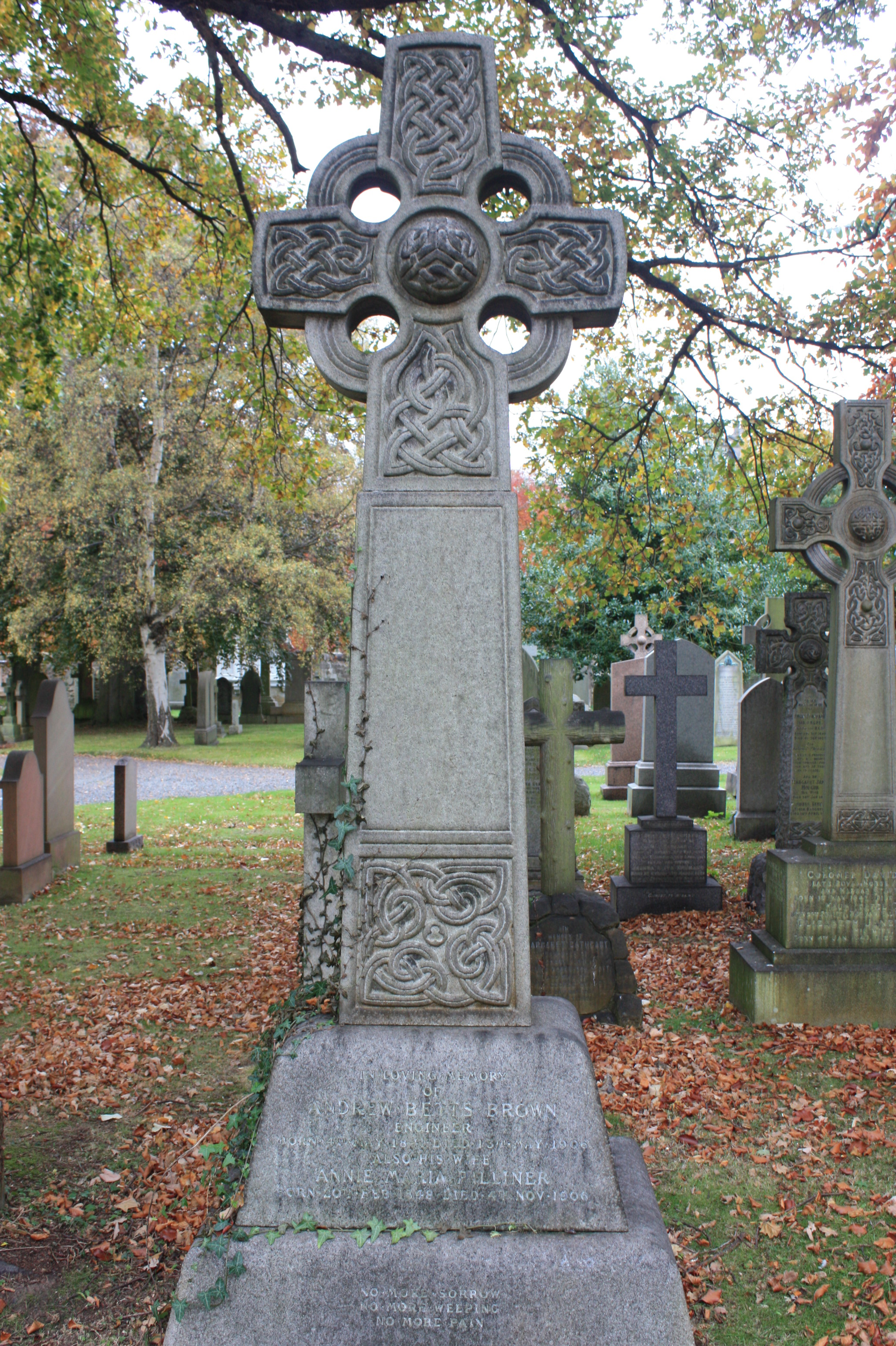
The grave of Andrew Betts Brown, Dean Cemetery

Andrew Betts Brown MICE MINA (1841–1906) was a Scottish engineer and inventor. He invented the hydraulic crane and overhead travelling crane. He founded several companies including the Vauxhall Iron Works, which later evolved into Vauxhall Motors, and the huge British engineering firm Brown Brothers.

== Life ==
He was born on 4 May 1841 in Edinburgh the eldest son of Robert Brown, a bricklayer living at 86 Canongate, and his wife, Marion Betts. He was educated at the High School in Edinburgh. From around 1855 he was apprenticed as an engineer with the North British Railway based at St Margaret’s Yard in Edinburgh. He took evening classes at the Watt College (later Heriot Watt) winning prizes in Natural Philosophy (Physics) and Dynamics. He then went to Manchester for two years to study Sciences and began specialising in hydraulics.

He is first listed as an "engineer" living back with his parents in Edinburgh in 1861. In 1862, living in Stockport, he took out a patent for the improvement of steam engines and boilers. In 1863 he purchased a former brewery in Vauxhall in London and created the Vauxhall Iron Works. In 1863 he invented an overhead travelling crane, which was successfully used to construct Blackfriars Bridge over the River Thames in central London.

In 1870 he received an unusual contract to install a steam-powered hydraulic system for launching ships within Hamburg Docks. This was largely constructed in the newly founded Rosebank Iron Works due to its proximity to a railway line. This huge L-plan foundry wrapped around Rosebank Cemetery. This was renamed Brown Brothers in 1885 and became one of Scotland’s largest foundries. The complex was demolished around the year 2000.

From the mid 1870s his interests began to drift towards marine engineering. He then invented the combine hydraulic/steam starting engine, common in all steamships thereafter, and the highly innovative steam-tiller (a forerunner of all power-steering devices). Around 1872 he invented the telemotor a mechanism allowing removal of most of the complex gears and chains between the control room and the engine on steamships. In 1874 he invented the Steam accumulator. He used this device to power further odd creations to load and unloads cargoes using steam-power. He provided the steering gear for both the RMS Lusitania and RMS Mauretania (the world's largest ship from 1906 to 1911).

In 1881 he resettled in Edinburgh living at 1 Rosebery Crescent in the city’s West End.

In 1884 he went into partnership with William F. King to create King, Brown & Co, electrical engineers based at the Rosebank Works in Leith. The Rosebank Works had been established by David George Brown (his brother) in 1872. The company was renamed Brown Brothers around 1900 and specialised in major ship components.

He died at home, 19 Douglas Crescent, in Edinburgh’s West End on 13 May 1906. He is buried with his wife in the north-west section of the Victorian extension to Dean Cemetery. The inscription on the stone, "no more pain", implies a prolonged illness before death.

Brown Brothers continued after his death, doing important engineering works, including building the world's first tanks for World War One.

== Family ==
In 1869 he married Anna Maria Pilliner of Jamaica (1848–1906), at Toxteth Park. They had four children.

== Publications ==
- Engineering Facts and Figures (1865)
