= William King (engineer) =

Scottish engineer

William Falconer King (17 April 1851 – 6 October 1929 in Hunter's Quay, Argyll) was a Scottish engineer. He was a pioneer in the laying of submarine telegraphy cables.

A student at the University of Glasgow and then employee of Sir William Thomson, King was responsible for laying the first transatlantic telegraph cable to Brazil, while serving as chief engineer (1873–84) of the Western and Brazilian Telegraph Company. For his services in Brazil Emperor Dom Pedro II awarded him a Knight of the Order of the Rose.

He was elected a Fellow of the Royal Society of Edinburgh in 1880. His proposers were William Thomson, Lord Kelvin, Peter Guthrie Tait, William Durham, and James Thomson Bottomley.

He returned to Scotland in 1884, living at Lonend on Russell Place in Trinity, Edinburgh. In Edinburgh he created the engineering firm of King, Brown & Co with Andrew Betts Brown based at the Rosebank Works in Leith and in 1894 King & Co, electrical engineers who built the Leith Electric Works at 1 Prince Regent Street and created the Leith Electricity Generating Station on Junction Place and installed one of Britain's first systems of electric street lights (1895) and Scotland's first electric tram system (also in Leith, 1910).

In the First World War his firm won the very lucrative contract from the Admiralty for the installation and repair of all electrical equipment in the Naval Dockyards at both Rosyth and Leith.

In later life he devoted much effort to the refinement of clocks and created a very fine chronometer which was installed in the Royal Observatory, Edinburgh on the Braid Hills.

He retired to Hunter's Quay in Argyllshire, where he had long kept a yacht and died there on 6 October 1929.
