= Floor =

Walking surface of a room

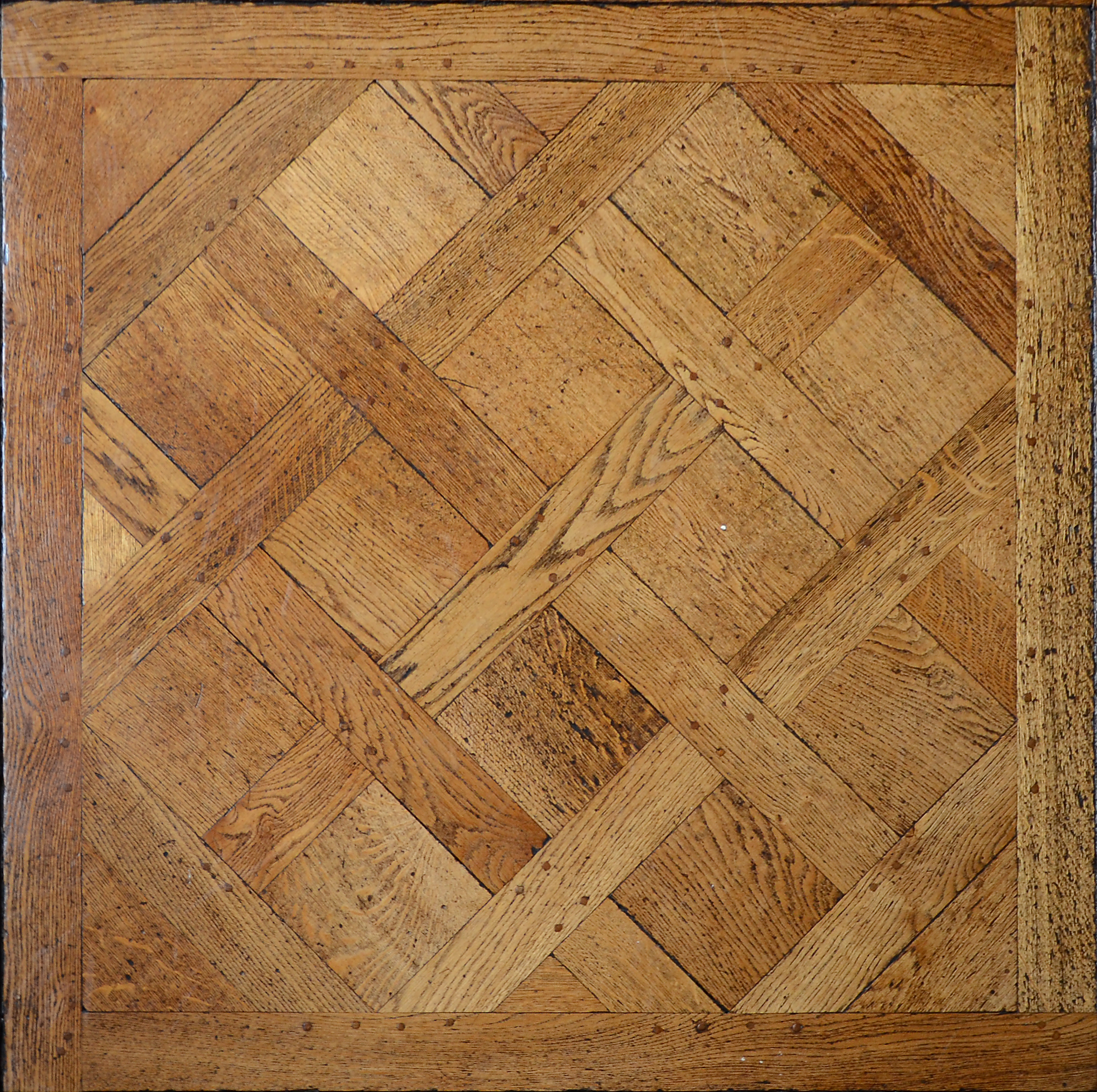
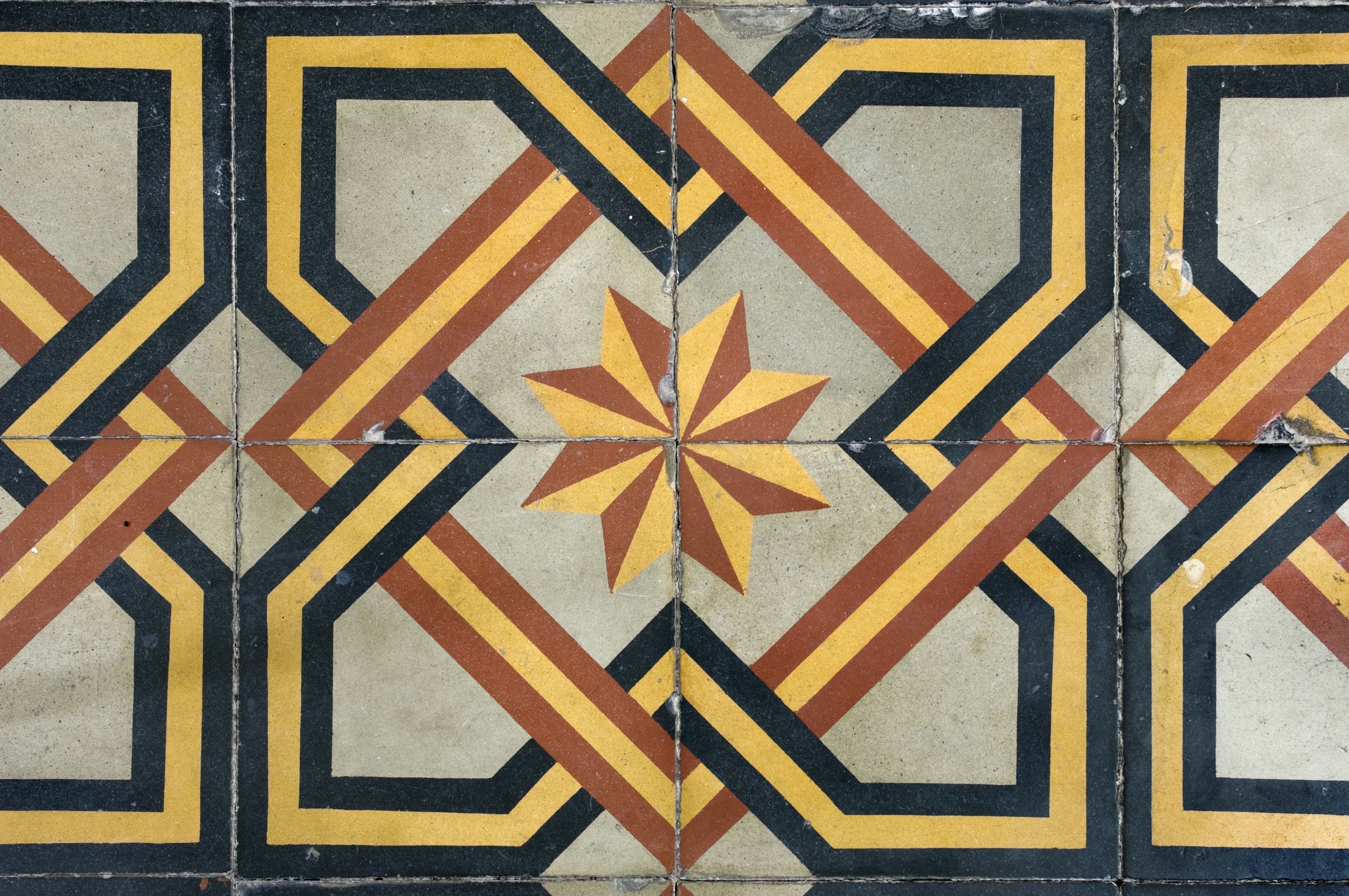
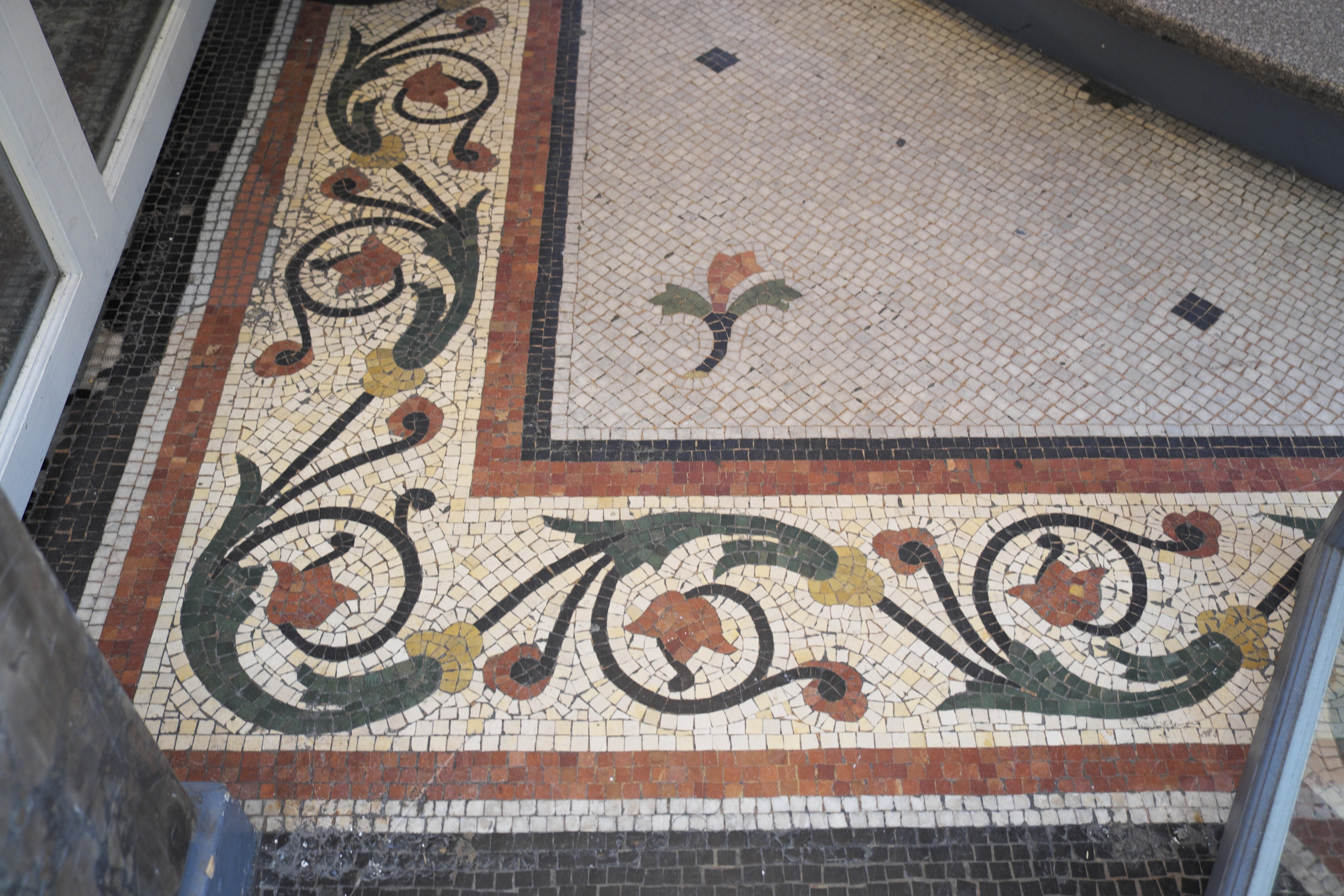
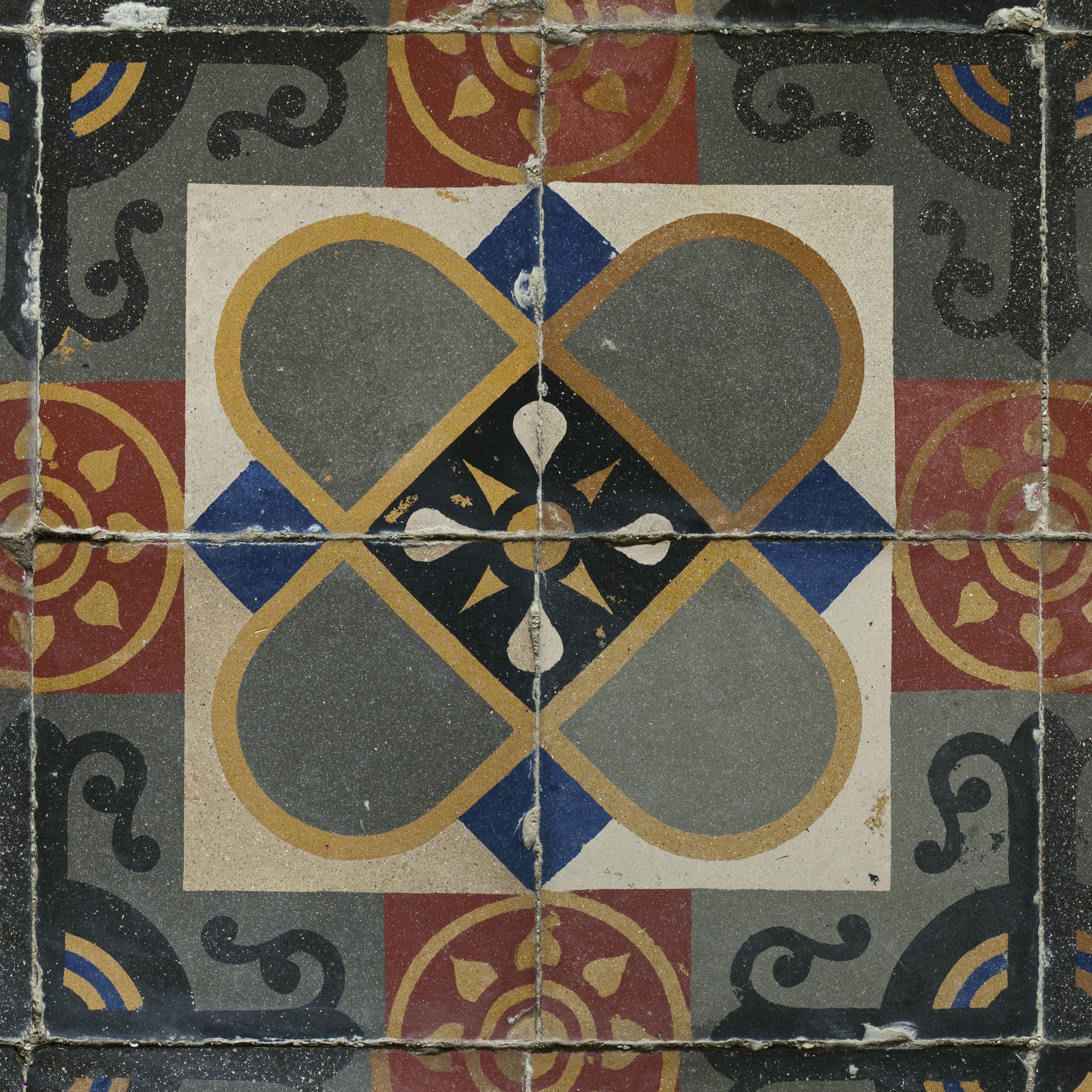
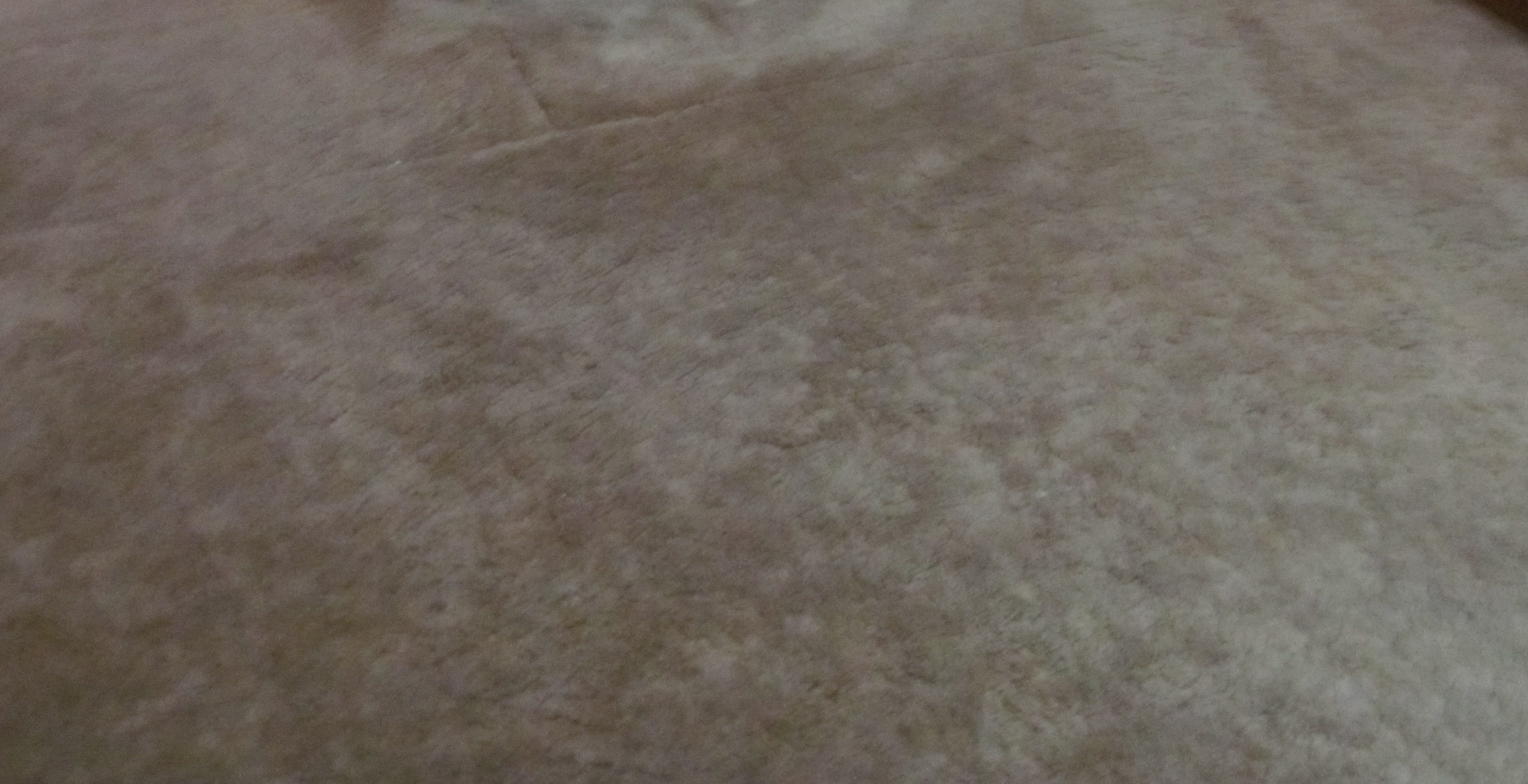
Examples of floors

A floor is the bottom surface of typically an enclosed space such as a room or vehicle. Floors vary from simple dirt in a cave to many layered surfaces made with modern technology. Floors may be stone, wood, bamboo, metal, or any other material that can support the expected load.

The levels of a building are often referred to as floors, although sometimes referred to as storeys or stories in American English.

Floors typically consist of a subfloor for support and a floor covering used to give a good walking surface. In modern buildings, the subfloor often has electrical wiring, plumbing, and other services built in. As floors must meet many needs, some essential to safety, floors are built to strict building codes in some regions.

Floors may be built on beams or joists or use structures like prefabricated hollow-core slabs. The subfloor builds on those and attaches by various means particular to the support structure, but the support and subfloor together always provides the strength of a floor one can sense underfoot.

== Special floor structures ==
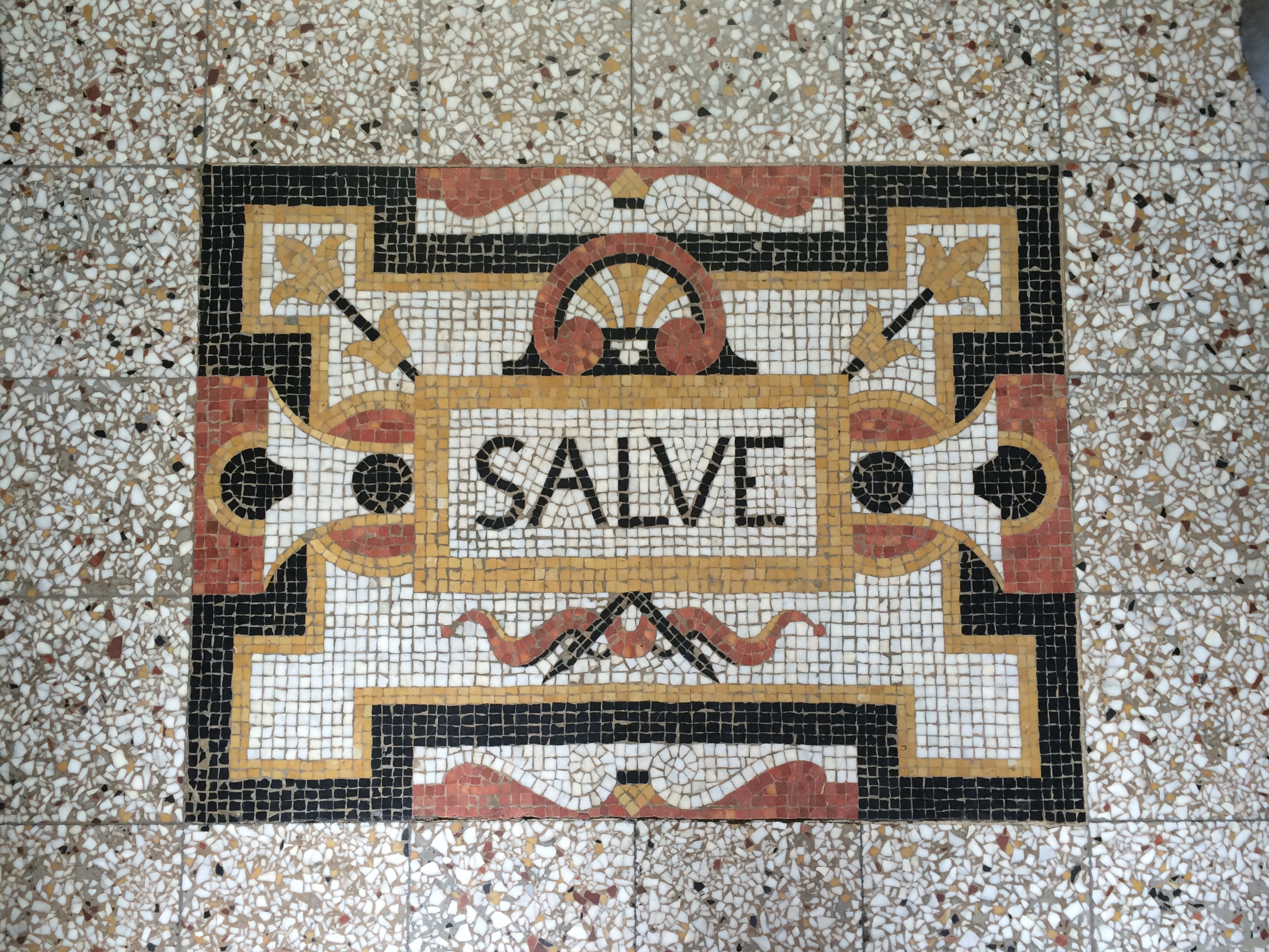
Floors may incorporate glass, mosaic, or other artistic expression, like this little mosaic from the Rietberg Museum in Zurich, Switzerland

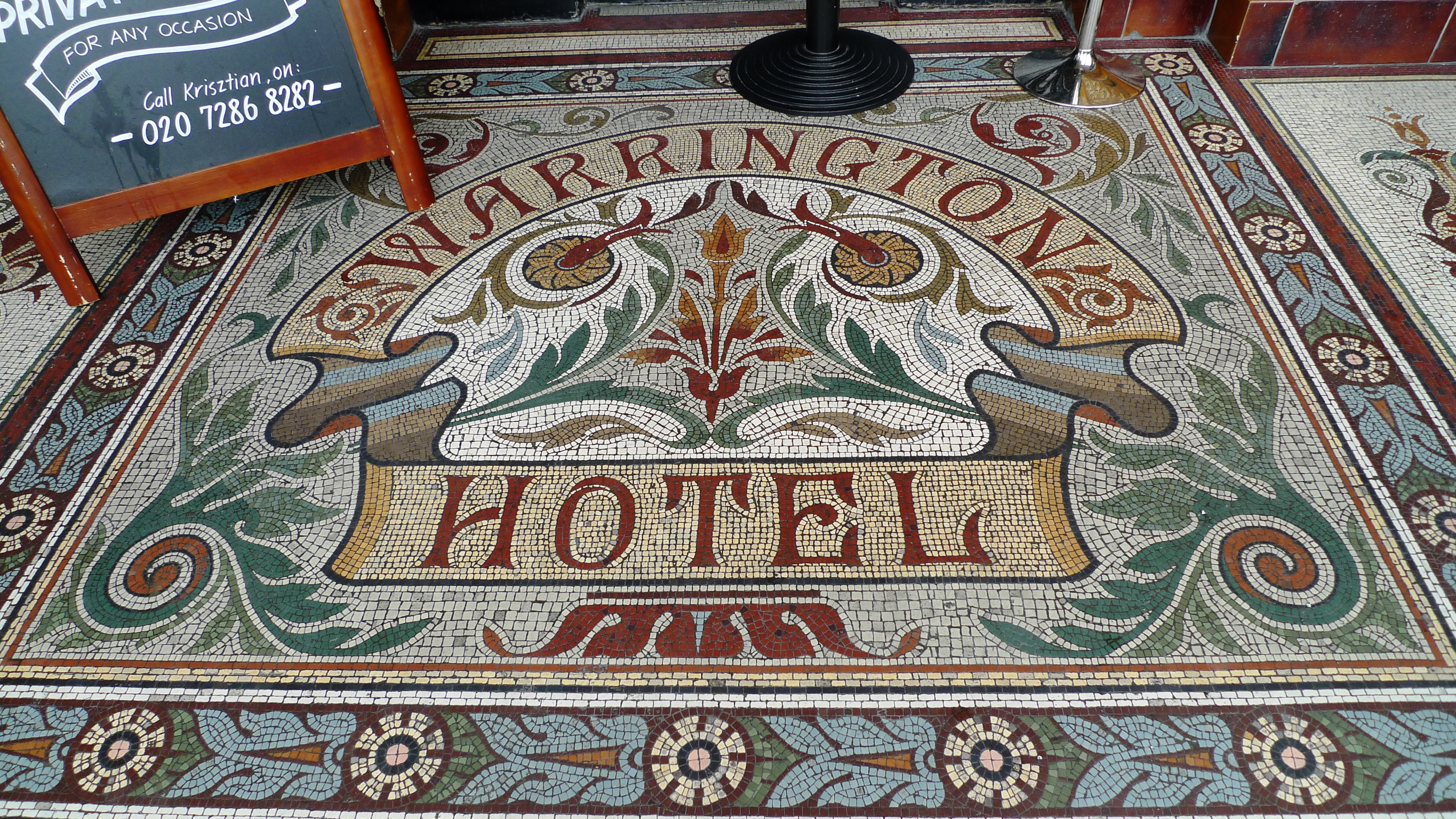
Art Nouveau mosaic at an entrance in the United Kingdom

Where a special floor structure like a floating floor is laid upon another floor, both may be called subfloors.

Special floor structures are used for a number of purposes:

- Balcony, a platform projecting from a wall
- Floating floor, normally for noise or vibration reduction
- Glass floor, as in glass bottomed elevators
- Nightingale floor makes a noise when an intruder walks on it
- Raised floor, utilities underneath can be accessed easily
- Sprung floor, improves the performance and safety of athletes and dancers
- Raked floor, improves the view of performers on a stage for an audience

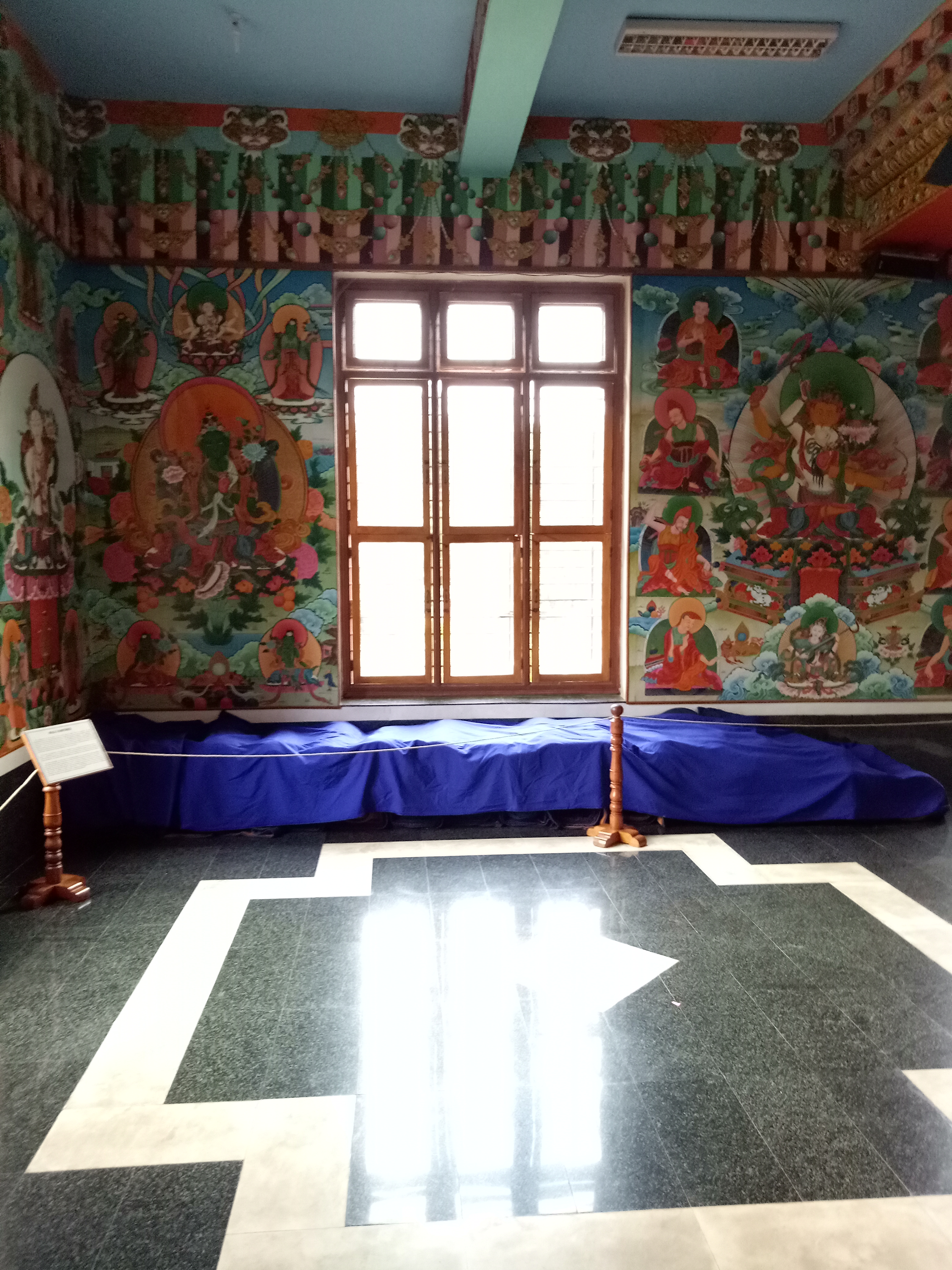
Floor tiles

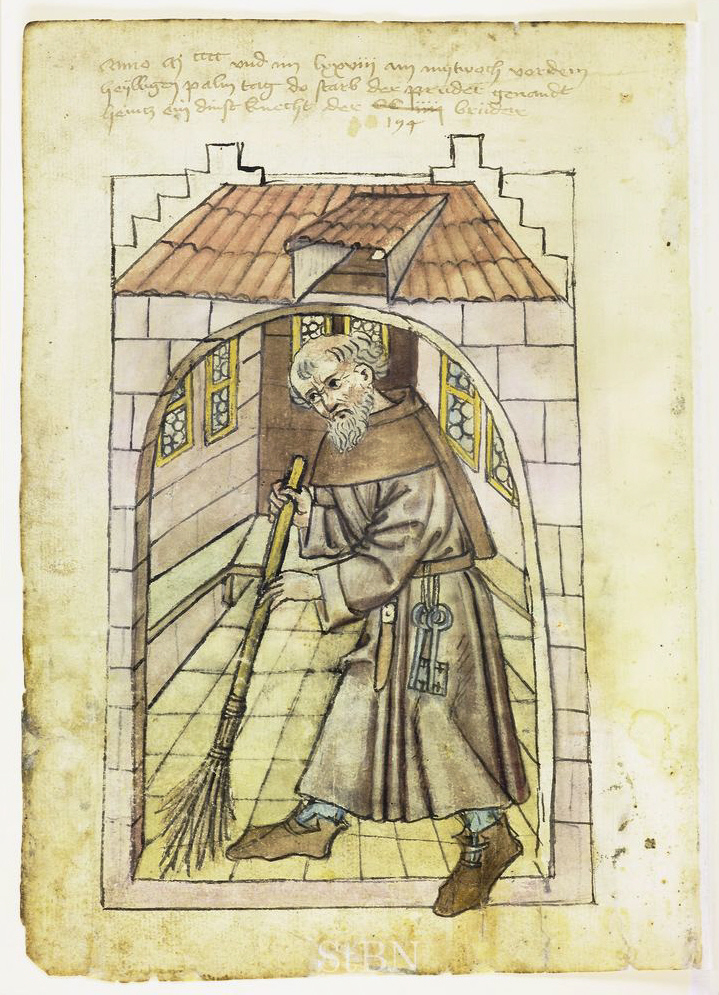
Monk sweeping the floor (1472)

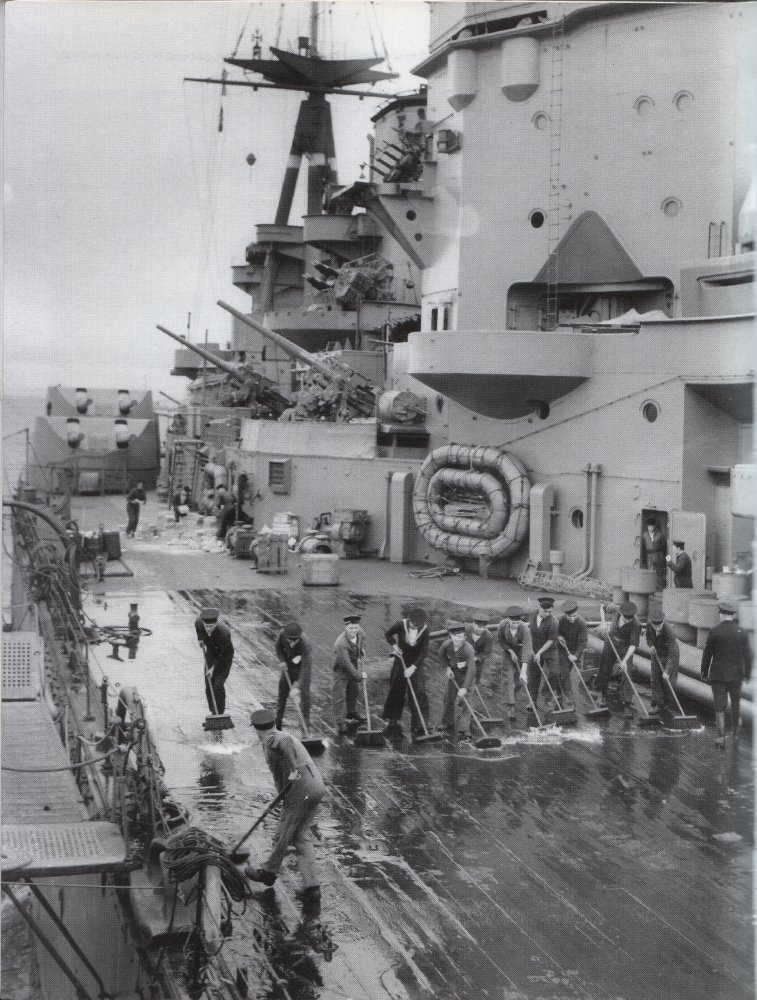
Sailors scrubbing the deck floor of the battleship HMS Rodney

== See also ==
- Floor area
- Floor cleaning
- Flooring
- Floor numbering
- Floor plan
- Self-cleaning floor
- Sensing floor
- Sidewalk
- Solid ground floor
- Storey
