= Sensing floor =

Floors with embedded sensors for analysis

A sensing floor is a floor with embedded sensors. Depending on their construction, these floors are either monobloc (e.g. structures made of a single frame, carpets). or modular (e.g. tiled floors, floors made of stripes of sensors). The first sensing floor prototypes were developed in the 1990s, mainly for human gait analysis. Such floors are usually used as a source of sensing information for an ambient intelligence. Depending on the type of sensors employed, sensing floors can measure load (pressure), proximity (to detect, track, and recognize humans), as well as the magnetic field (for detecting metallic objects like robots using magnetometers).

Sensing floors have a variety of usages:

- Gait analysis for human identification and continuous health diagnosis (either in domestic or hospital environments)
- Mapping of the environment for autonomous robots
- Controller for interactive applications (as a MIDI music instrument, a games controller, dance movement analysis, etc.)

More than 30 distinct sensing floor prototypes have been developed between 1990 and 2015. Notable examples of sensing floors have been developed by Oracle, MIT, and Inria. As of 2015, few sensing floors are available as commercial products, mainly targeting healthcare facilities (e.g. the GAITRite surface pressure sensing floor, and the SensFloor).
