= Anwar Chitayat =

American inventor and business executive

- Born: 21 August 1927 (age 99); Baghdad, Iraq
- Education: New York University Tandon School of Engineering
- Spouse(s): Deanna, Constance, Ann
- Children: 5 (Mara, Aimee, Duri, Adrienne and Olivia)
- Parents: Khadoory Chitayat (father); Khatoon Aboody (mother)

Anwar Chitayat (born August 21, 1927) is an Iraqi-American manufacturer. He founded the Anorad Corporation, a company acquired by Rockwell Automation in 1998.

Chitayat's work focuses on linear motor technology and high-performance positioning systems.

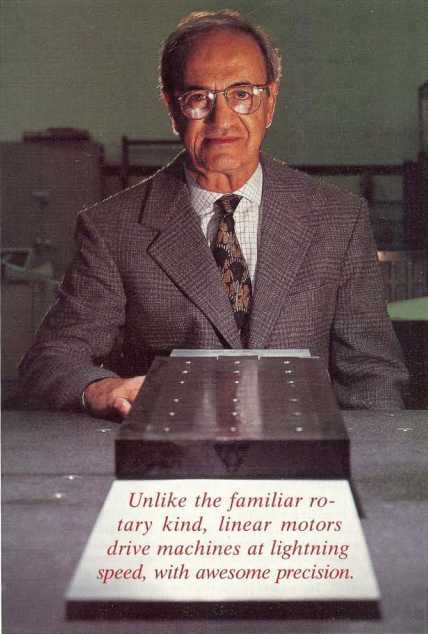
FORTUNE Cover Page Photo, November 25, 1996

== Early life ==
Chitayat was born on August 21, 1927, in Baghdad, Iraq. He was raised with six siblings in a low-income household. He was awarded a scholarship to study Mechanical Engineering in the United States. He received simultaneous B.Sc. degrees in Electrical and Mechanical Engineering from the University of Denver in 1951, and an M.Sc. in Electrical Engineering from the Polytechnic Institute of Brooklyn in 1952, now known as the New York University Tandon School of Engineering. When Anwar’s family moved to Israel, he chose to remain in the U.S. as a displaced person. In 1952, Chitayat joined the U.S. Army for two years and was stationed in Alaska, servicing the U.S. DEW Line. He became a U.S. citizen shortly after leaving the U.S. Army.

== Education ==
- B.Sc. Mechanical Engineering, University of Denver.
- B.Sc. Electrical Engineering, University of Denver.
- M.Sc. Electrical Engineering, Polytechnic Institute of Brooklyn, (now New York University Tandon School of Engineering).

== Anorad Corporation ==
Chitayat founded the Anorad Corporation from his basement in Plainview, New York in 1972. Anorad is an acronym derived from "Anwar's Own Research and Development".

== Notable patents and discoveries ==
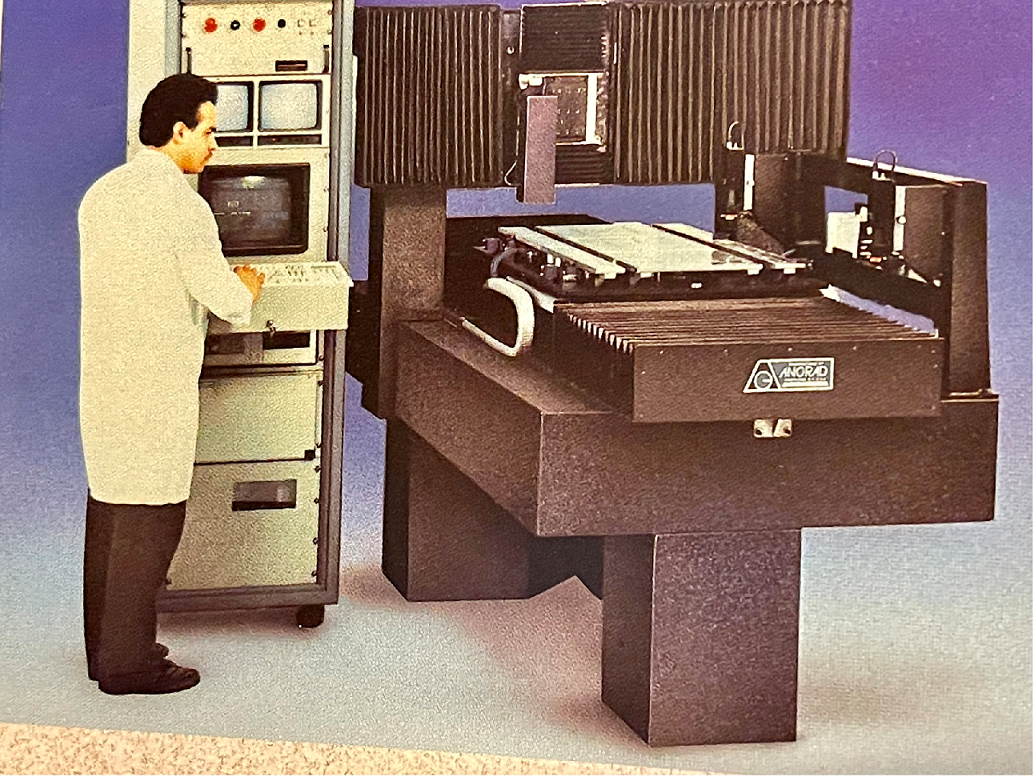
An Anorad laser machining, vision guided system

=== High speed with high-precision manufacturing ===
Chitayat has contributed towards work in linear motor technology and its applications in high-performance positioning systems.

=== Nanotechnology and laser interferometers ===
Chitayat held over thirty patents related to the measurement and manufacturing of extra small components, including those as small as a nanometer. Achieving this small size required the development of new technologies using interferometry for measurement, nanopositioning motors, and stages. Interferometers manufacture and measure semiconductors by using the wavelength of light as a measuring stick. Length and angles were measured using small fractions of laser light waves.^{[s1]}^{[s2]}^{[s3]}^{[s10]}

Chitayat began working on nanotechnology in the 1960s when it had little practical value. Later, these technologies became necessary for the manufacture of microprocessors and semiconductors and now serve as a basis for computers, phones, and other electronic products.^{[s6]}

=== Fiber optics ===
Chitayat was awarded 4 patents for the use of fiber optics in imaging, including techniques for image enhancement. One of these systems was used in the Apollo program to monitor the rocket engines. Optical lenses were placed near the rocket engines, and the fiber optics transmitted images remotely to human monitors and cameras.

=== Satellite and star trackers ===
Chitayat's first invention was a light-modulating scanner, which enabled Kollsman Instruments to manufacture a star tracking system for use in moonlit conditions, twilight, and daylight. This daylight star tracker was used to navigate airplanes and ships by determining their precise location using the latitude and longitude of the stars. This system is now obsolete due to the introduction of GPS.

== Awards and recognition ==
Chitayat'swork on the Brushless Linear Motor was recognized by SEMI in 2000. In 1997, Chitayat received the "Entrepreneur of the Year" award from Ernst and Young. He was inducted into the Long Island Hall of Fame in 2009 for his contributions to science and technology.

== Personal life ==
Chitayat has married three times and has two daughters with his first wife, Deanna: Mara and Aimee. Deanna Chitayat holds a PhD in Experimental Psychology and served as a Dean of Hofstra University.

== Sources ==
1.Chitayat, Anwar (January 1964). "The Utilization of Krypton & LASER Interferometers for Photographic Mansuration". Photo-Optical Data Reduction. 2: 9. Bibcode:1964SPIE....2....9C.
2.Chitayat, Anwar (September 1964). "The Utilization of Krypton and Laser Interferometers for Photographic Mansuration". Proceedings of the SPIE. Photo-Optical Data Reduction. 2: 89–99. Bibcode:1964SPIE....2...89C. doi:10.1117/12.970698. S2CID 121697092.
4.Chitayat, Anwar (May 18, 1998). "Linear Motors Come Into Their Own" Design News
5.Chitayat, Anwar (Volume 11, 1987). "Linear Motors Provide Fast and Precise Motion" official proceedings of the international motor conference
6.Chitayat, Anwar (July 3–5, 1994). "Nanometer X-Y positioning states for scanning and stepping" Proceedings of the International Symposium on Manufacturing.
7.Chitayat, Anwar (March 6–12, 2009) "Long Island technology hall of fame" Long Island Business News.
8. Paul Schreiber (September 14, 1967). "Watching Over We The People" Newsday.
9. Brown, Stewart F (November 25, 1996). "The Fast New World Of Flat Motors" Fortune.
10.Chitayat, Anwar (June 1967). "Review of recent applications of laser interferometers in automatic checkout correction and control". IEEE Journal of Quantum Electronics. 3 (6): 263. Bibcode:1967IJQE....3..263C. doi:10.1109/JQE.1967.1074509.
