= Steam accumulator =

A steam accumulator is an insulated steel pressure tank containing hot water and steam under pressure. It is a type of energy storage device. It can be used to smooth out peaks and troughs in demand for steam. Steam accumulators may take on a significance for energy storage in solar thermal energy projects. An example is the PS10 solar power plant near Seville, Spain and one planned for the "solar steam train" project in Sacramento, California.

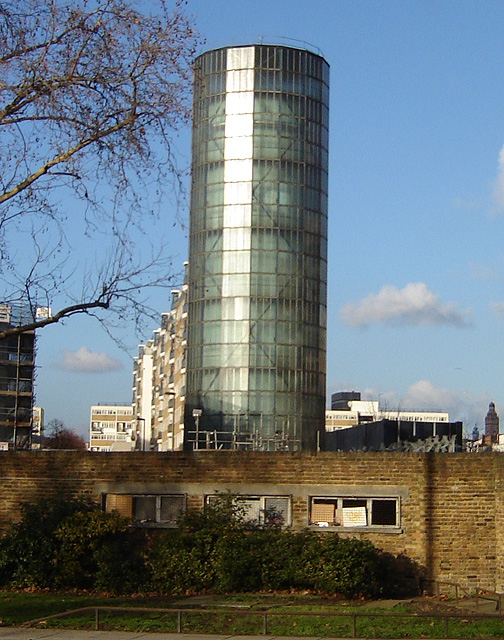
District heating steam accumulator tower on the Churchill Gardens Estate, Pimlico, London, United Kingdom. This plant once used waste heat piped from Battersea Power Station on the opposite side of the River Thames. (January 2006)

== History ==
It was invented in 1874 by the Scottish engineer Andrew Betts Brown.

== Charge ==
The tank is about half-filled with cold water and steam is blown in from a boiler via a perforated pipe near the bottom of the drum. Some of the steam condenses and heats the water. The remainder fills the space above the water level. When the accumulator is fully charged the condensed steam will have raised the water level in the drum to about three-quarters full and the temperature and pressure will also have risen.

== Discharge ==
Steam can be drawn off as required, either for driving a steam turbine or for process purposes (e.g. in chemical engineering), by opening a steam valve on top of the drum. The pressure in the drum will fall but the reduced pressure causes more water to boil and the accumulator can go on supplying steam (while gradually reducing pressure and temperature) for some time before it has to be re-charged.

== Pressure and temperature ==
This steam table shows the relationship between pressure and temperature in a boiler or steam accumulator:

Gauge pressure, PSI (bar)	Absolute pressure, PSI (bar)	Temperature, °F (°C)
0 (0)	15 (1)	212 (100)
35 (2.4)	50 (3.4)	281 (138)
85 (5.9)	100 (6.9)	328 (164)
135 (9.3)	150 (10.3)	358 (181)
185 (12.8)	200 (13.8)	382 (194)
235 (16.2)	250 (17.2)	401 (205)

- Absolute pressure = gauge pressure + atmospheric pressure

== See also ==
- Fireless locomotive

== Sources ==
- Everyman's Encyclopaedia 1931, volume 2, page 543
