= Servo bandwidth =

Servo bandwidth is the maximum trackable sinusoidal frequency of amplitude $A$, with tracking achieved at or before 10% of amplitude $A$ is reached. The servo bandwidth indicates the capability of the servo to follow rapid changes in the commanded input. It is usually specified as a frequency in hertz or radian/sec.

== Explanation ==
Bandwidth of systems is generally defined to be the frequency at which the system's amplitude is $\tfrac{1}{\sqrt{2}}$ times the signal amplitude. But if we apply same logic to servo systems it is difficult to analyze and develop a system to a sufficiently accurate specification. This is because of ambiguity with regard to frequency at which the amplitude should go to $\tfrac{1}{\sqrt{2}}$.

A simple and sound definition can be sought regarding this. Let us say we want to design a position servo control system with following specifications:

- Bandwidth: 10 Hz
- Allowed amplitude range : ± 50°

The above definition is not enough to design a practical control system. The definitions above have inherent problems with regard to what amplitude the manufacturer should take to design the servo with 10 Hz bandwidth. If the manufacturer takes the amplitude to be ±20° and rise time for this amplitude to be 0.025 sec (10 Hz sinusoid) and some other manufacturer takes amplitude to be ±50°, the acceleration requirements calculated by two will be very different.

This leads us to understand that giving servo bandwidth alone with no amplitude specification is almost useless. Also defining the bandwidth as per normal bandwidth definition does not help (ambiguity with regard to frequency at which the amplitude should go to $\tfrac{1}{\sqrt{2}})$.

== See also ==
- Servomechanism
