= Floor vibration =

Floor vibrations in buildings caused by walking, dancing, mechanical equipment or other rhythmic excitation may cause an annoyance to the occupants or impede the function of sensitive equipment.

Three key parameters dominate human perception:

Fundamental frequency
lower frequencies are more likely to be perceptible and irritating
Amplitude
the maximum displacement response to a reference excitation
Damping
dissipation in the floor structure that significantly reduces vibration amplitude

== See also ==
- Architectural acoustics
