= Transfer line =

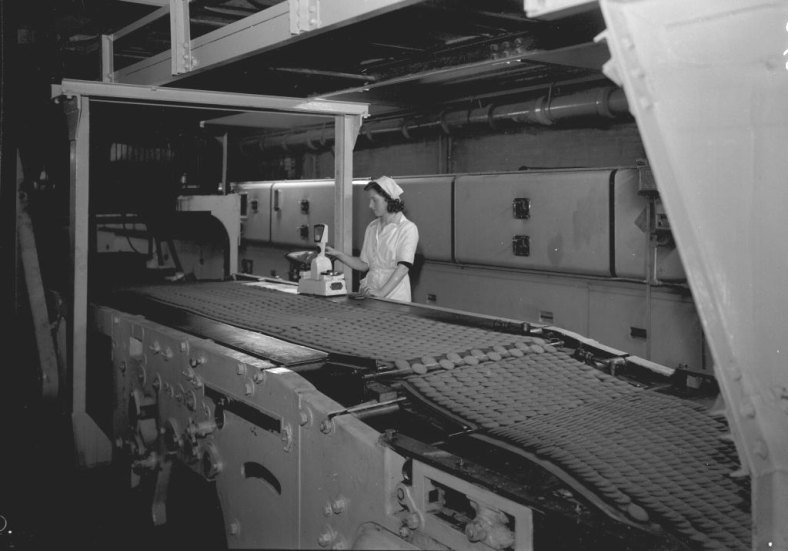
Wright's Biscuits transfer line: production flow without batching

A transfer line is a manufacturing system which consists of a predetermined sequence of machines connected by an automated material handling system and designed for working on a very small family of parts. Parts can be moved singularly because there’s no need for batching when carrying parts between process stations (as opposed to a job shop for example). The line can be synchronous, meaning that all parts advance with the same speed, or asynchronous, meaning buffers exist between stations where parts wait to be processed. Not all transfer lines must geometrically be straight lines, for example circular solutions have been developed which make use of rotary tables, however using buffers becomes almost impossible.

A crucial problem for this production system is that of line balancing: a trade-off between increasing productivity and minimizing cost conserving total processing time.

== Advantages ==
- Easy management: low work in progress and scheduling without simultaneous processing of different products
- Low need for manpower
- Less space needed (compare with job shop)
- Less output variability: no alternative technological cycles and quality control is more effective (less WIP and easier to automate)
- High system saturation: less production mix variability
- Fast lead time.
- High volume of production is possible.

== Disadvantages ==
- Very low flexibility
- Risk of obsolescence: due to new product introduction
- High vulnerability to failures: a failure in a single machine blocks the whole system in very short time

== See also ==
- Job shop
- Production line
- Workflow
