= Jackscrew =

Mechanical lifting device operated by turning a leadscrew

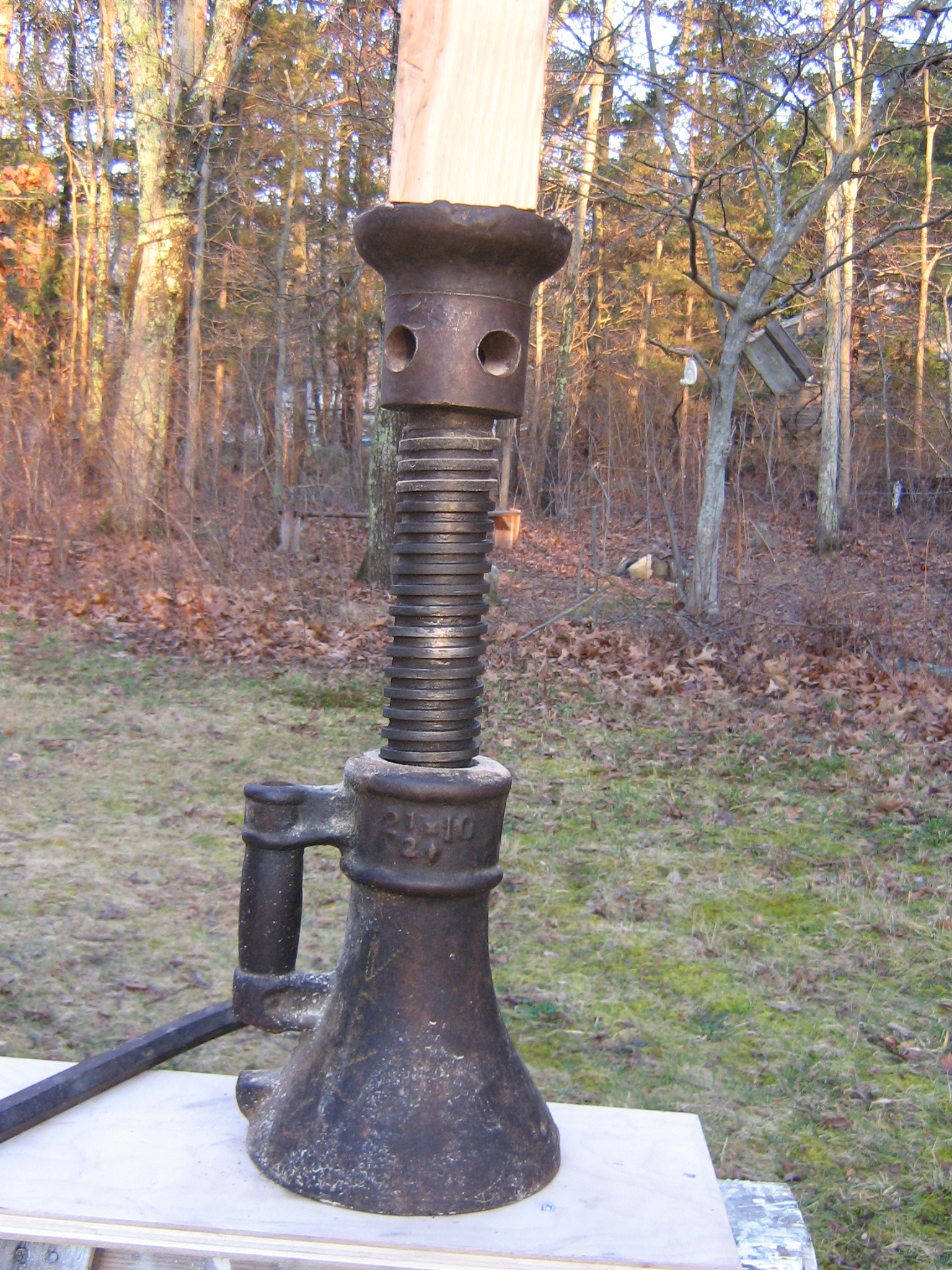
A 2.5-ton screw jack. The jack is operated by inserting the bar (visible lower left) in the holes at the top and turning.

A jackscrew, or screw jack, is a type of jack that is operated by turning a leadscrew. It is commonly used to lift moderate to heavy weights, such as vehicles; to raise and lower the horizontal stabilizers of aircraft; and as adjustable supports for heavy loads, such as the foundations of houses.

== Description ==
A screw jack consists of a heavy-duty vertical screw with a load table mounted on its top, which screws into a threaded hole in a stationary support frame with a wide base resting on the ground. A rotating collar on the head of the screw has holes into which the handle, a metal bar, fits. When the handle is turned clockwise, the screw moves further out of the base, lifting the load resting on the load table. In order to support large load forces, the screw is usually formed with Acme threads.

== Advantages ==
An advantage of jackscrews over some other types of jack is that they are self-locking, which means when the rotational force on the screw is removed, it will remain motionless where it was left and will not rotate backwards, regardless of how much load it is supporting. This makes them inherently safer than hydraulic jacks, for example, which will move backwards under load if the force on the hydraulic actuator is accidentally released.

== Mechanical advantage ==
The ideal mechanical advantage of a screw jack, the ratio of the force the jack exerts on the load to the input force on the lever ignoring friction is

$$\frac {F_\text{load}}{F_\text{in}} = \frac {2 \pi r}{l} \,$$

where

$F_\text{load} \,$ is the force the jack exerts on the load.
$F_\text{in} \,$ is the rotational force exerted on the handle of the jack
$r \,$ is the length of the jack handle, from the screw axis to where the force is applied
$l \,$ is the lead of the screw.

The screw jack consists of two simple machines in series; the long operating handle serves as a lever whose output force turns the screw. So the mechanical advantage is increased by a longer handle as well as a finer screw thread. However, most screw jacks have large amounts of friction which increase the input force necessary, so the actual mechanical advantage is often only 30% to 50% of this figure.

=== Limitations ===
Screw jacks are limited in their lifting capacity. Increasing load increases friction within the screw threads. A fine pitch thread, which would increase the advantage of the screw, also reduces the speed of which the jack can operate. Using a longer operating lever soon reaches the point where the lever will simply bend at its inner end.

Screw jacks have now largely been replaced by hydraulic jacks. This was encouraged in 1858 when jacks by the Tangye company to Bramah's hydraulic press concept were applied to the successful launching of Brunel's SS Great Eastern, after two failed attempts by other means. The maximum mechanical advantage possible for a hydraulic jack is not limited by the limitations on screw jacks and can be far greater. After World War II, improvements to the grinding of hydraulic rams and the use of O ring seals reduced the price of low-cost hydraulic jacks and they became widespread for use with domestic cars. Screw jacks still remain for minimal-cost applications, such as the little-used tyre-changing jacks supplied with cars, or where their self-locking property is important, such as for horizontal stabilizers on aircraft.

== Applications ==
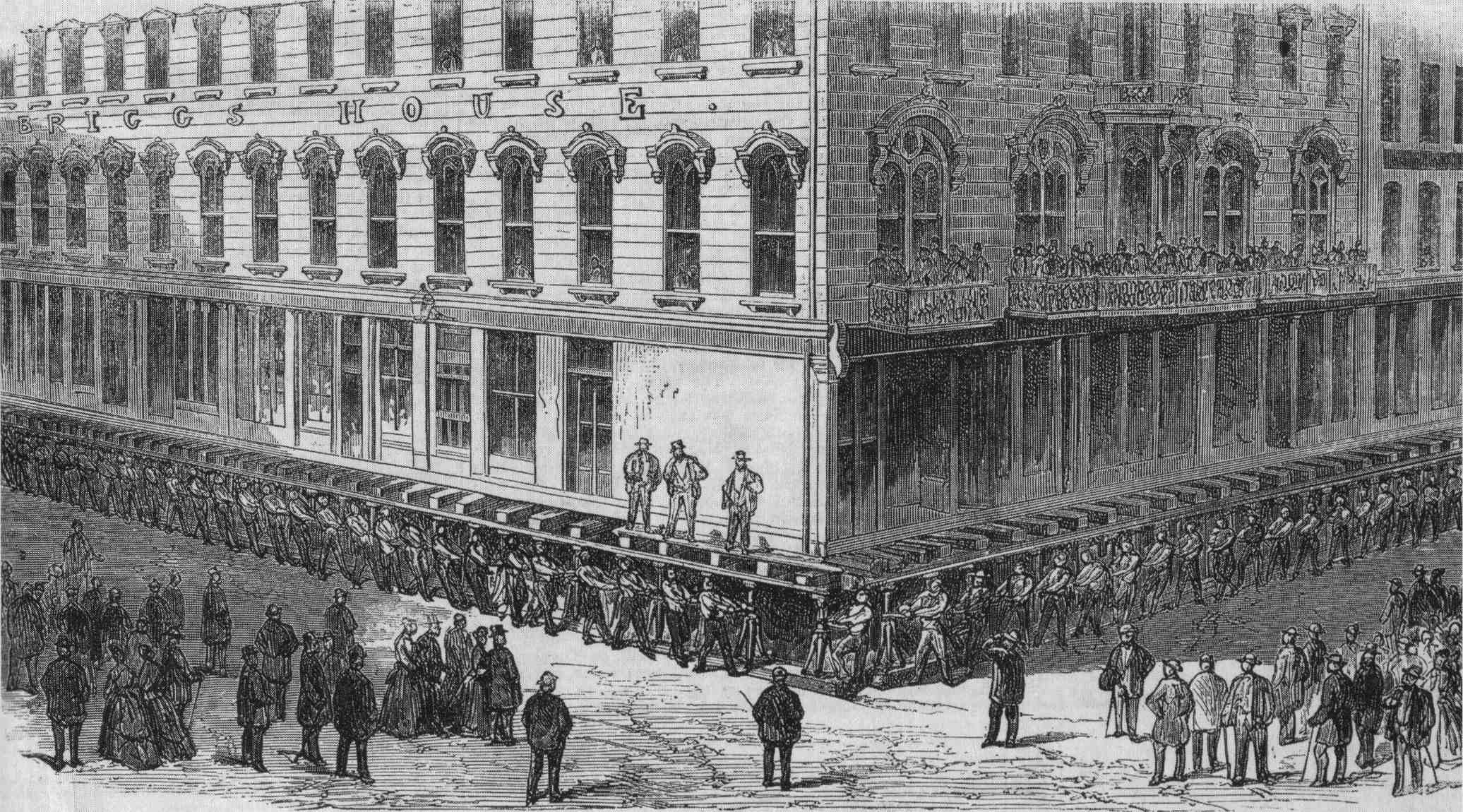
In the 19th century, the Raising of Chicago involved entire city blocks being lifted with jackscrews.

The large area of sliding contact between the screw threads means jackscrews have high friction and low efficiency as power transmission linkages, around 30%–50%. So they are not often used for continuous transmission of high power, but more often in intermittent positioning applications.

In heavy-duty applications, such as screw jacks, a square thread or buttress thread is used, because it has the lowest friction and wear.

=== Industrial and technical applications ===
In technical applications, such as actuators, an Acme thread is used, although it has higher friction, because it is easy to manufacture, wear can be compensated for, it is stronger than a comparably sized square thread and it makes for smoother engagement.

The ball screw is a more advanced type of leadscrew that uses a recirculating-ball nut to minimize friction and prolong the life of the screw threads. The thread profile of such screws is approximately semicircular (commonly a "gothic arch" profile) to properly mate with the bearing balls. The disadvantage to this type of screw is that it is not self-locking. Ball screws are prevalent in powered leadscrew actuators.

=== Aviation ===
A Boeing 737 uses an adjustable horizontal stabilizer, moved by a jackscrew, to provide the required pitch trim forces. Generic stabilizer illustrated.

Jackscrews are also used extensively in aircraft systems to raise and lower horizontal stabilizers.

The failure of a jackscrew on a Yakovlev Yak-42 airliner due to design flaws resulted in the crash of Aeroflot Flight 8641 in 1982.

The failure of a jackscrew on a McDonnell Douglas MD-80 due to deficient maintenance brought down Alaska Airlines Flight 261 in 2000.

A MRAP armoured vehicle being transported aboard National Airlines Flight 102 in 2013, a Boeing 747-400BCF freighter, broke loose immediately after takeoff and smashed through the rear bulkhead. Both flight recorders were knocked offline, hydraulic lines were severed and most critically, the horizontal stabilizer actuator’s jackscrew was destroyed, rendering the aircraft uncontrollable.

=== Machinist's jacks ===
A machinist's jack is a miniature screw jack used to support protruding parts of a workpiece or to balance clamping forces on that workpiece during machining operations. Aside from their size, these frequently look no different from the screw jacks used to lift buildings off their foundations. Machinist's jacks can be as simple as a threaded spacer with a bolt in it to serve as a jackscrew.

=== In electronic connectors ===
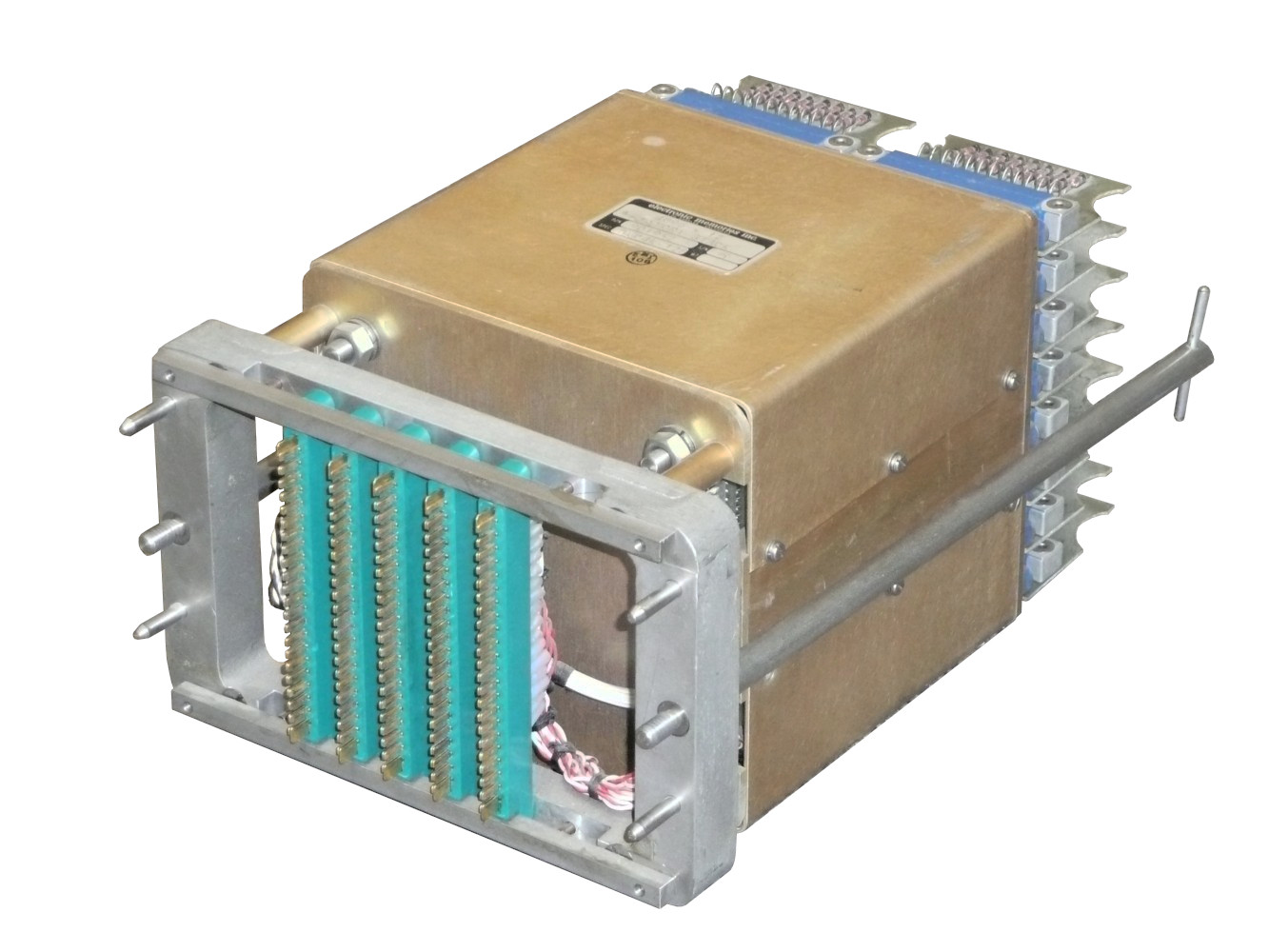
An electronics module mounted on the back of a large electrical connector incorporating two very long T-handle jackscrews

The term jackscrew is also used for the captive screws that draw the two parts of some electrical connectors together and hold them mated. These are commonly encountered on D-subminiature connectors, where they serve primarily to prevent accidental disconnection. On larger connectors such as the one illustrated, the jack screws also help align the connectors and overcome the large frictional forces involved in inserting or removing the connector. When unscrewed, they allow the connector halves to be taken apart. Jackscrews in electrical connectors may have ordinary screw heads or extended heads designed as thumbscrews.

The idea of incorporating jack screws into electrical connectors was not considered novel in the late 1950s and early 1960s. Some patents from that era show pairs of jackscrews on opposite sides of a multi-pin connector. Another shows a single central jackscrew. These patents mention the phrase "jack screw" incidentally, without asserting a claim to the idea.

Jack screws may have either male or female threads, and on some connectors, the genders of the screws as well as various alignment pins may be mixed in order to prevent the wrong connector from being connected to the wrong socket.

== See also ==
- Acrow prop
- Ball screw
- Leadscrew
- Roller screw
