= Backlash (engineering) =

Clearance between mating components

In mechanical engineering, backlash, sometimes called lash, play, or slop, is a clearance or lost motion in a mechanism caused by gaps between the parts. It can be defined as "the maximum distance or angle through which any part of a mechanical system may be moved in one direction without applying appreciable force or motion to the next part in mechanical sequence."^{p. 1-8} An example, in the context of gears and gear trains, is the amount of clearance between mated gear teeth. It can be seen when the direction of movement is reversed and the slack or lost motion is taken up before the reversal of motion is complete. It can be heard from the railway couplings when a train reverses direction. Another example is in a valve train with mechanical tappets, where a certain range of lash is necessary for the valves to work properly.

Backlash

Depending on the application, backlash may or may not be desirable. Some amount of backlash is unavoidable in nearly all reversing mechanical couplings, although its effects can be negated or compensated for. In many applications, the theoretical ideal would be zero backlash, but in actual practice some backlash must be allowed to prevent jamming. Reasons for specifying a requirement for backlash include allowing for lubrication, manufacturing errors, deflection under load, and thermal expansion. A principal cause of undesired backlash is wear.

== Gears ==
Factors affecting the amount of backlash required in a gear train include errors in profile, pitch, tooth thickness, helix angle and center distance, and run-out. The greater the accuracy the smaller the backlash needed. Backlash is most commonly created by cutting the teeth deeper into the gears than the ideal depth. Another way of introducing backlash is by increasing the center distances between the gears.

Backlash due to tooth thickness changes is typically measured along the pitch circle and is defined by:

$$b_t=t_i-t_a\;$$

where:

$b_t\;$	= backlash due to tooth thickness modifications
$t_i\;$	= tooth thickness on the pitch circle for ideal gearing (no backlash)
$t_a\;$	= actual tooth thickness

Backlash, measured on the pitch circle, due to operating center modifications is defined by: The speed of the machine. The material in the machine

$$b_c = 2 \left( \Delta c \right) \tan\phi$$

where:

$b_c\;$	= backlash due to operating center distance modifications
$\Delta c\;$	= difference between actual and ideal operating center distances
$\phi \;$	= pressure angle

Standard practice is to make allowance for half the backlash in the tooth thickness of each gear. However, if the pinion (the smaller of the two gears) is significantly smaller than the gear it is meshing with then it is common practice to account for all of the backlash in the larger gear. This maintains as much strength as possible in the pinion's teeth. The amount of additional material removed when making the gears depends on the pressure angle of the teeth. For a 14.5° pressure angle the extra distance the cutting tool is moved in equals the amount of backlash desired. For a 20° pressure angle the distance equals 0.73 times the amount of backlash desired.

As a rule of thumb the average backlash is defined as 0.04 divided by the diametral pitch; the minimum being 0.03 divided by the diametral pitch and the maximum 0.05 divided by the diametral pitch. In metric, you can just multiply the values with the module:

$$b_{avg}=0.04 * m$$

In a gear train, backlash is cumulative. When a gear-train is reversed the driving gear is turned a short distance, equal to the total of all the backlashes, before the final driven gear begins to rotate. At low power outputs, backlash results in inaccurate calculation from the small errors introduced at each change of direction; at large power outputs backlash sends shocks through the whole system and can damage teeth and other components.

== Anti-backlash designs ==
In certain applications, backlash is an undesirable characteristic and should be minimized.

=== Gear trains where positioning is key but power transmission is light ===
The best example here is an analog radio tuner dial where one may make precise tuning movements both forwards and backwards. Specialized gear designs allow this. One of the more common designs splits the gear into two gears, each half the thickness of the original.

One half of the gear is fixed to its shaft while the other half of the gear is allowed to turn on the shaft, but pre-loaded in rotation by small coil springs that rotate the free gear relative to the fixed gear. In this way, the spring compression rotates the free gear until all of the backlash in the system has been taken out; the teeth of the fixed gear press against one side of the teeth of the pinion while the teeth of the free gear press against the other side of the teeth on the pinion. Loads smaller than the force of the springs do not compress the springs and with no gaps between the teeth to be taken up, backlash is eliminated.

=== Leadscrews where positioning and power are both important ===
Another area where backlash matters is in leadscrews. Again, as with the gear train example, the culprit is lost motion when reversing a mechanism that is supposed to transmit motion accurately. Instead of gear teeth, the context is screw threads. The linear sliding axes (machine slides) of machine tools are an example application.

Most machine slides for many decades, and many even today, have been simple (but accurate) cast-iron linear bearing surfaces, such as a dovetail- or box-slide, with an Acme leadscrew drive. With just a simple nut, some backlash is inevitable. On manual (non-CNC) machine tools, a machinist's means for compensating for backlash is to approach all precise positions using the same direction of travel, that is, if they have been dialing left, and next want to move to a rightward point, they will move rightward past it, then dial leftward back to it; the setups, tool approaches, and toolpaths must in that case be designed within this constraint.

The next-more complex method than the simple nut is a split nut, whose halves can be adjusted, and locked with screws, so that the two sides ride, respectively, against leftward thread and the other side rides rightward faces. Notice the analogy here with the radio dial example using split gears, where the split halves are pushed in opposing directions. Unlike in the radio dial example, the spring tension idea is not useful here, because machine tools taking a cut put too much force against the screw. Any spring light enough to allow slide movement at all would allow cutter chatter at best and slide movement at worst. These screw-adjusted split-nut-on-an-Acme-leadscrew designs cannot eliminate all backlash on a machine slide unless they are adjusted so tight that the travel starts to bind. Therefore, this idea can't totally obviate the always-approach-from-the-same-direction concept; nevertheless, backlash can be held to a small amount (1 or 2 thousandths of an inch or), which is more convenient, and in some non-precise work is enough to allow one to "ignore" the backlash, i.e., to design as if there were none. CNCs can be programmed to use the always-approach-from-the-same-direction concept, but that is not the normal way they are used today, because hydraulic anti-backlash split nuts, and newer forms of leadscrew than Acme/trapezoidal -- such as recirculating ball screws -- effectively eliminate the backlash. The axis can move in either direction without the go-past-and-come-back motion.

The simplest CNCs, such as microlathes or manual-to-CNC conversions, which use nut-and-Acme-screw drives can be programmed to correct for the total backlash on each axis, so that the machine's control system will automatically move the extra distance required to take up the slack when it changes directions. This programmatic "backlash compensation" is a cheap solution, but professional grade CNCs use the more expensive backlash-eliminating drives mentioned above. This allows them to do 3D contouring with a ball-nosed endmill, for example, where the endmill travels around in many directions with constant rigidity and without delays.

In mechanical computers a more complex solution is required, namely a frontlash gearbox. This works by turning slightly faster when the direction is reversed to 'use up' the backlash slack.

Some motion controllers include backlash compensation. Compensation may be achieved by simply adding extra compensating motion (as described earlier) or by sensing the load's position in a closed loop control scheme. The dynamic response of backlash itself, essentially a delay, makes the position loop less stable and thus more prone to oscillation.

== Minimum backlash ==
Minimum backlash is calculated as the minimum transverse backlash at the operating pitch circle allowable when the gear teeth with the greatest allowable functional tooth thickness are in mesh with the pinion teeth with their greatest allowable functional tooth thickness, at the smallest allowable center distance, under static conditions.

Backlash variation is defined as the difference between the maximum and minimum backlash occurring in a whole revolution of the larger of a pair of mating gears.

== Applications ==
Backlash in gear couplings allows for slight angular misalignment. There can be significant backlash in unsynchronized transmissions because of the intentional gap between the dogs in dog clutches. The gap is necessary to engage dogs when input shaft (engine) speed and output shaft (driveshaft) speed are imperfectly synchronized. If there was a smaller clearance, it would be nearly impossible to engage the gears because the dogs would interfere with each other in most configurations. In synchronized transmissions, synchromesh solves this problem.

However, backlash is undesirable in precision positioning applications such as machine tool tables. It can be minimized by choosing ball screws or leadscrews with preloaded nuts, and mounting them in preloaded bearings. A preloaded bearing uses a spring and/or a second bearing to provide a compressive axial force that maintains bearing surfaces in contact despite reversal of the load direction.

== See also ==
- Bauschinger effect
- Harmonic drive
- Hysteresis
- Motion amplification, optical-visual technique for detecting and visualizing vibrations
- List of gear nomenclature
