= Bookpress =

A bookpress is either:

- a screw press used in the binding or rebinding of books
- an early form of bookcase, used in medieval cloisters, to which books were attached using a chain
