= Actuator =

Machine component that moves a mechanism

An actuator is a component of a machine that produces force, torque, or displacement, when an electrical, pneumatic or hydraulic input is supplied to it in a system (called an actuating system). The effect is usually produced in a controlled way. An actuator translates a stimulus such as an input signal into the required form of mechanical energy. It is a type of transducer. In simple terms, it is a "mover".

An actuator requires a control device (which provides control signal) and a source of energy. The control signal is relatively low in energy and may be voltage, electric current, pneumatic, or hydraulic fluid pressure, or even human power. In the electric, hydraulic, and pneumatic sense, it is a form of automation or automatic control.

The displacement achieved is commonly linear or rotational, as exemplified by linear motors and rotary motors, respectively. Rotary motion is more natural for small machines making large displacements. By means of a leadscrew, ball screw, or roller screw, rotary motion can be adapted to function as a linear actuator (which produces a linear motion, but is not a linear motor).

Another broad classification of actuators separates them into two types: incremental-drive actuators and continuous-drive actuators. Stepper motors are one type of incremental-drive actuators. Examples of continuous-drive actuators include DC torque motors, induction motors, hydraulic and pneumatic motors, and piston-cylinder drives (rams).

== Types of actuators ==
=== Mechanical ===
An actuator can be just a mechanism that is directly driven by the motions or forces of other parts of the system. An example is the camshafts that drive the intake and exhaust valves in internal combustion engines, driven by the engine itself. Another example is the mechanism that strikes the hours in a traditional grandfather clock or cuckoo clock.

=== Hydraulic ===
A hydraulic actuator typically uses the pressure of a liquid (usually oil) to cause a piston to slide inside a hollow cylindrical tube into linear, rotary, or oscillatory motion. In a single acting actuator the fluid pressure is applied to just one side of the piston, so that it applies useful force in only one direction. The opposite motion may be affected by a spring, by gravity, or by other forces present in the system. In a double acting actuator, the return stroke is driven by fluid pressure applied to the opposite side of the piston.

Since liquids are nearly impossible to compress, a hydraulic actuator can exert a large force. The drawback of this approach is its limited acceleration. They respond quickly to input changes, have little inertia, can operate continuously over a relatively large working range, and can hold their position without any significant energy input.

A hydraulic actuator can be used to displace the rack of a rack and pinion mechanism, causing the pinion to turn. This arrangement is used, for example, to operate valves in pipelines and other industrial fluid transport installations.

=== Pneumatic ===
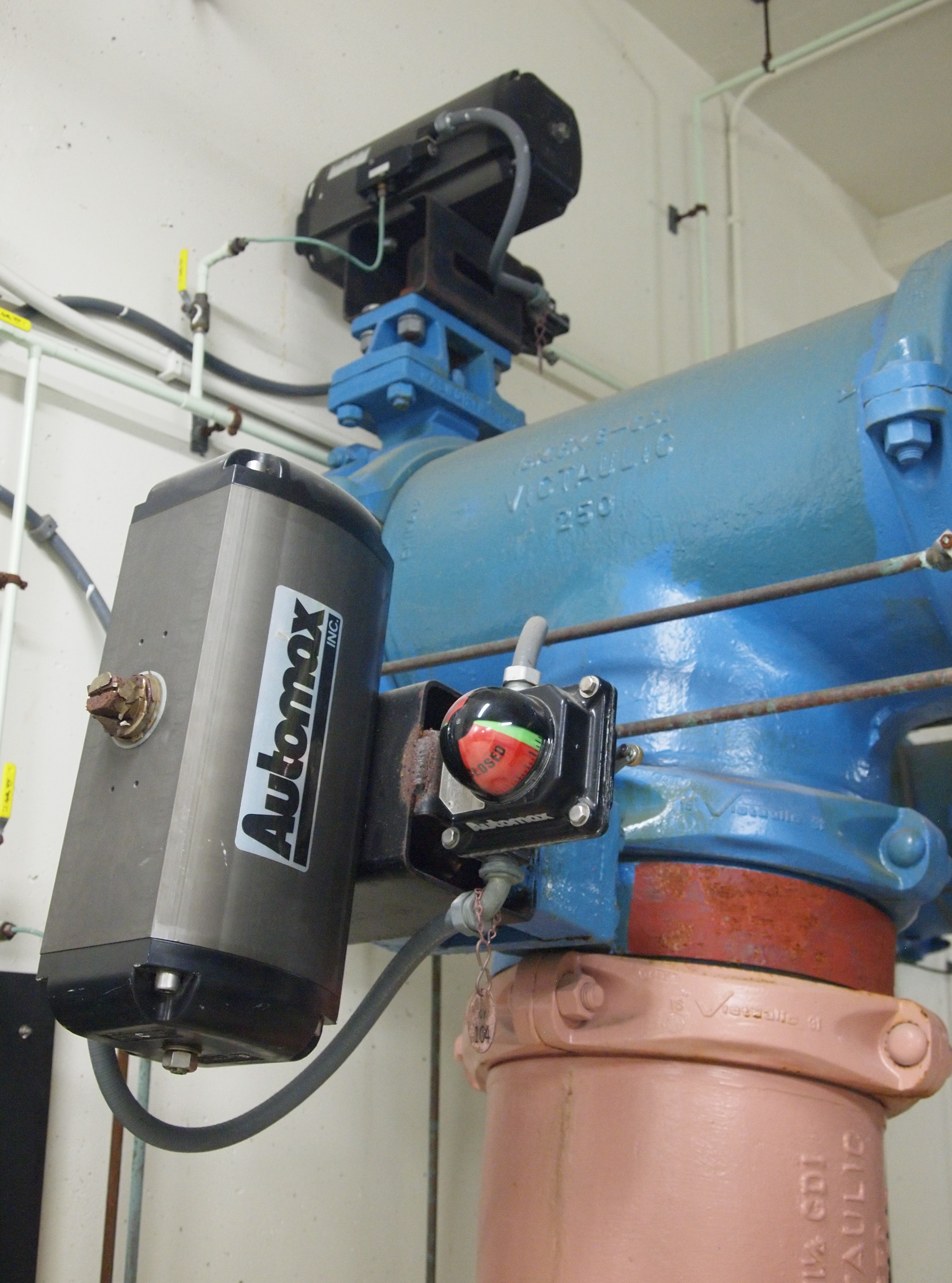
Pneumatic actuator operating a valve through a rack-and-pinion mechanism.

A pneumatic actuator is similar to a hydraulic one but uses a gas (usually air) instead of a liquid. Compared to hydraulic actuators, pneumatic ones are less complicated because they do not need pipes for the return and recycling of the working fluid. On the other hand, they still need external infrastructure such as compressors, reservoirs, filters, and air treatment subsystems, which often makes them less convenient than electrical or electromechanical actuators.

In the first steam engines and in all steam locomotives, steam pressure is used to drive pneumatic actuators to produce a reciprocating motion, which is converted to rotary motion by some sort of crankshaft mechanism.

=== Electric ===
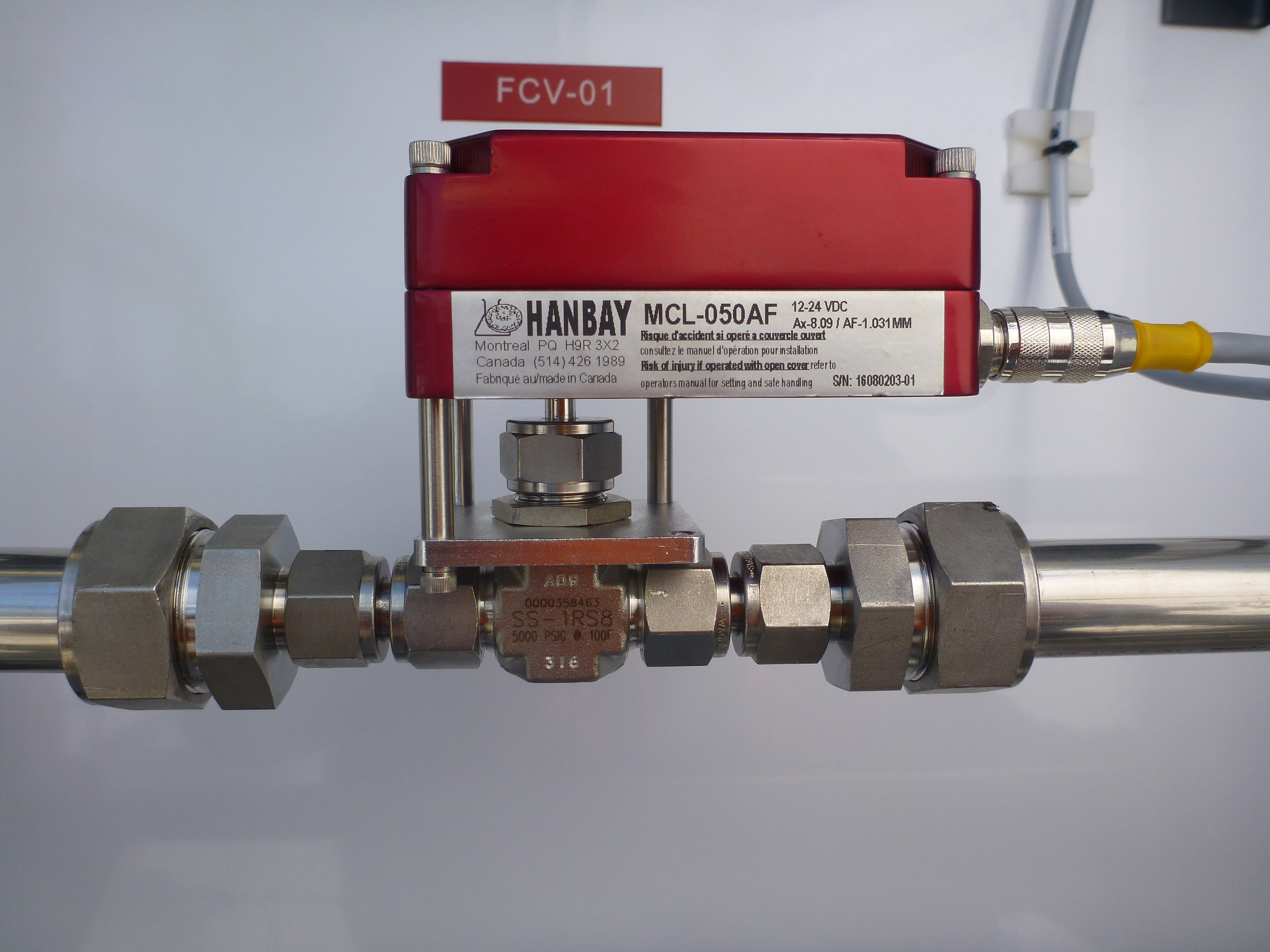
Electric valve actuator controlling a ½ needle valve.

Since 1960, several actuator technologies have been developed. An electric actuator typically uses an electric motor to generate torque, which is then converted into linear or rotary motion to drive a mechanical system. Electric actuators can be classified in the following groups:

==== Electromechanical ====
An electromechanical actuator (EMA) uses mechanical means to convert the rotational force of an ordinary (rotary) electric motor into a linear movement. The mechanism may be a toothed belt or a screw (either a ball or a lead screw or planetary roller screw).

The main advantages of electromechanical actuators are their relatively good level of accuracy with respect to pneumatics, their possible long lifecycle and the little maintenance effort required (might require grease). It is possible to reach relatively high force, on the order of 100 kN.

The main limitation of these actuators are the reachable speed, the important dimensions and weight they require. The main application of such actuators is mainly seen in health care devices and factory automation.

==== Electrohydraulic ====
Another approach is an electrohydraulic actuator, where the electric motor remains the prime mover but provides torque to operate a hydraulic accumulator that is then used to transmit actuation force in much the same way that diesel engine/hydraulics are typically used in heavy equipment.

Electrical energy is used to actuate equipment such as multi-turn valves, or electric-powered construction and excavation equipment.

When used to control the flow of fluid through a valve, a brake is typically installed above the motor to prevent the fluid pressure from forcing open the valve. If no brake is installed, the actuator gets activated to reclose the valve, which is slowly forced open again. This sets up an oscillation (open, close, open ...) and the motor and actuator will eventually become damaged.

==== Rotary ====
Electric rotary actuators use a rotary motor to turn the target part over a certain angle. Rotary actuators can have up to a rotation of 360 degrees. This allows it to differ from a linear motor as the linear is bound to a set distance compared to the rotary motor. Rotary motors have the ability to be set at any given degree in a field making the device easier to set up still with durability and a set torque.

Rotary motors can be powered by 3 different techniques such as Electric, Fluid, or Manual. However, Fluid powered rotary actuators have 5 sub-sections of actuators such as Scotch Yoke, Vane, Rack-and-Pinion, Helical, and Electrohydraulic. All forms have their own specific design and use allowing the ability to choose multiple angles of degree.

Rotary actuators have numerous applications but are often found in hydraulic pressured devices and industries or tasks with motion control systems. Rotary actuators are even used in robotic arms in industry lines.

==== Linear ====
A linear electric actuator uses a linear motor, which can be thought as a rotary electric motor which has been cut and unrolled. Thus, instead of producing a rotational movement, it produces a linear force along their length. Because it generally has lower friction losses than the alternatives, a linear electric actuator can last over a hundred million cycles.

Linear motors are divided in 3 basic categories: flat linear motor (classic), U-Channel linear motors and Tubular linear motors.

Linear motor technology is the best solution in the context of a low load (up to 30Kg) because it provides the highest level of speed, control and accuracy.

In fact, it represents the most desired and versatile technology. Due to the limitations of pneumatics, the current electric actuator technology is a viable solution for specific industry applications and it has been successfully introduced in market segments such as the watchmaking, semiconductor and pharmaceutical industries (as high as 60% of the applications. The growing interest for this technology, can be explained by the following characteristics:

- High precision (equal or less than 0,1 mm);
- High cycling rate (greater than 100 cycles/min);
- Possible usage in clean and highly-regulated environments (no leakages of air, humidity or lubricants allowed);
- Need for programmable motion in the situation of complex operations

The main disadvantages of linear motors are:

- They are expensive respect to pneumatics and other electric technologies.
- They are not easy to integrate in standard machineries due to their important size and high weight.
- They have a low force density respect to pneumatic and electromechanical actuators.

=== Thermal ===
An actuator may be driven by heat through the expansion that most solid material exhibit when the temperature increases. This principle is commonly used, for example, to operate electric switches in thermostats. Typically, a (non-electronic) thermostat contains a strip with two layers of different metals, that will bend when heated.

Thermal actuators may also exploit the properties of shape-memory alloys.

=== Magnetic ===
Some actuators are driven by externally applied magnetic fields. They typically contain parts made of ferromagnetic materials that are strongly attracted to each other when they are magnetized by the external field. An example are the reed switches that may be used as door opening sensors in a building security system.

Alternatively, magnetic actuators can use magnetic shape-memory alloys.

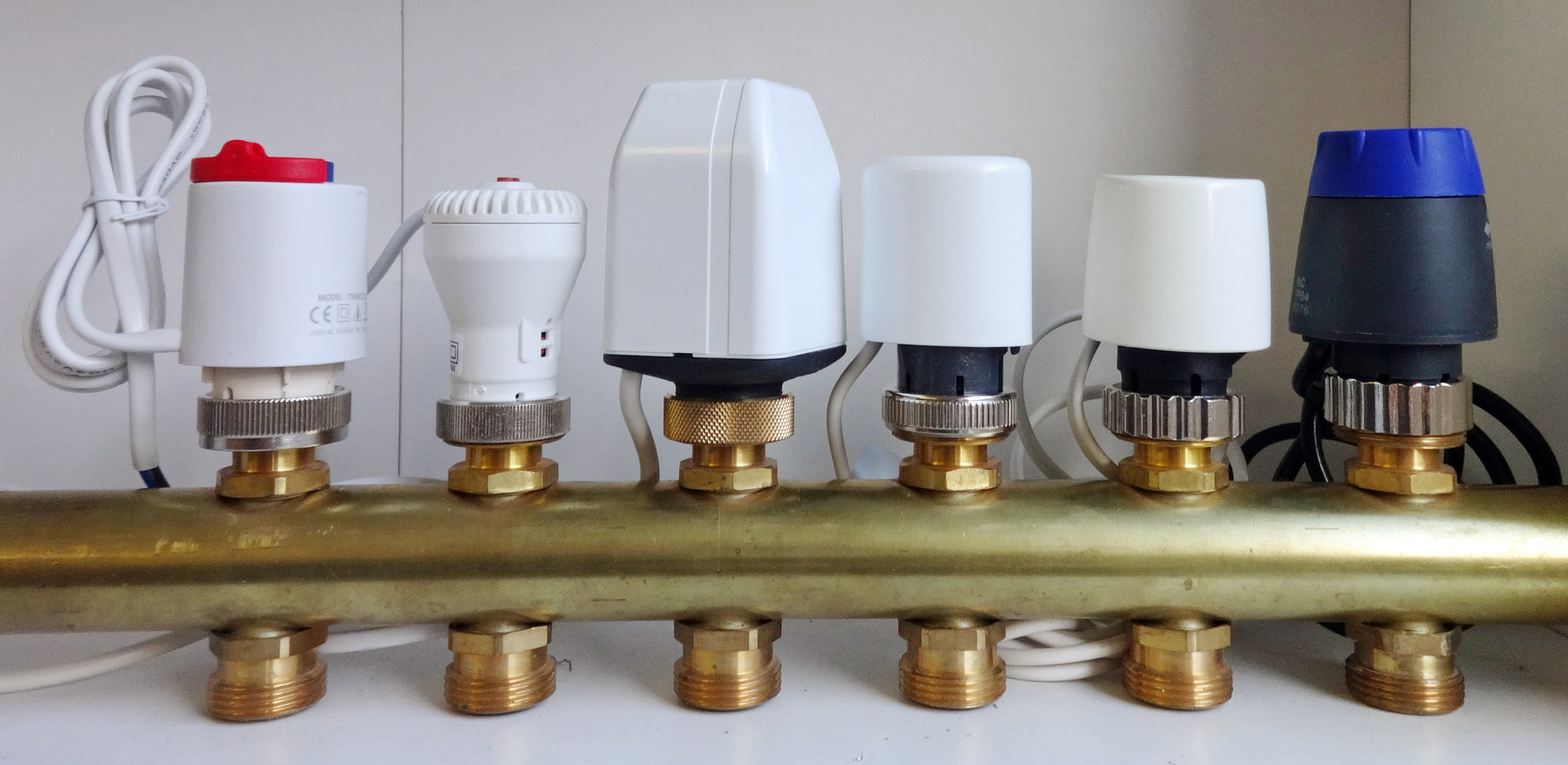
Thermal actuators

=== Soft actuators ===
A soft actuator is made of a flexible material that changes its shape in response to stimuli including mechanical, thermal, magnetic, and electrical. Soft actuators mainly deal with the robotics of humans rather than industry which is what most of the actuators are used for. For most actuators they are mechanically durable yet do not have an ability to adapt compared to soft actuators. The soft actuators apply to mainly safety and healthcare for humans which is why they are able to adapt to environments by disassembling their parts. This is why the driven energy behind soft actuators deal with flexible materials like certain polymers and liquids that are harmless

The majority of the existing soft actuators are fabricated using multistep low yield processes such as micro-moulding, solid freeform fabrication, and mask lithography. However, these methods require manual fabrication of devices, post processing/assembly, and lengthy iterations until maturity in the fabrication is achieved. To avoid the tedious and time-consuming aspects of the current fabrication processes, researchers are exploring an appropriate manufacturing approach for effective fabrication of soft actuators. Therefore, special soft systems that can be fabricated in a single step by rapid prototyping methods, such as 3D printing, are utilized to narrow the gap between the design and implementation of soft actuators, making the process faster, less expensive, and simpler. They also enable incorporation of all actuator components into a single structure eliminating the need to use external joints, adhesives, and fasteners.

Shape memory polymer (SMP) actuators are the most similar to our muscles, providing a response to a range of stimuli such as light, electrical, magnetic, heat, pH, and moisture changes. They have some deficiencies including fatigue and high response time that have been improved through the introduction of smart materials and combination of different materials by means of advanced fabrication technology. The advent of 3D printers has made a new pathway for fabricating low-cost and fast response SMP actuators. The process of receiving external stimuli like heat, moisture, electrical input, light or magnetic field by SMP is referred to as shape memory effect (SME). SMP exhibits some rewarding features such a low density, high strain recovery, biocompatibility, and biodegradability.

Photopolymers or light activated polymers (LAP) are another type of SMP that are activated by light stimuli. The LAP actuators can be controlled remotely with instant response and, without any physical contact, only with the variation of light frequency or intensity.

A need for soft, lightweight and biocompatible soft actuators in soft robotics has influenced researchers for devising pneumatic soft actuators because of their intrinsic compliance nature and ability to produce muscle tension.

Polymers such as dielectric elastomers (DE), ionic polymer–metal composites (IPMC), ionic electroactive polymers, polyelectrolyte gels, and gel-metal composites are common materials to form 3D layered structures that can be tailored to work as soft actuators. EAP actuators are categorized as 3D printed soft actuators that respond to electrical excitation as deformation in their shape.

== Examples and applications ==
In engineering, actuators are frequently used as mechanisms to introduce motion, or to clamp an object so as to prevent motion. In electronic engineering, actuators are a subdivision of transducers. They are devices which transform an input signal (mainly an electrical signal) into some form of motion.

=== Examples of actuators ===
- Comb drive
- Digital micromirror device
- Electric motor
- Electroactive polymer
- Hydraulic cylinder
- Piezoelectric actuator
- Plasma actuator
- Pneumatic actuator
- Screw jack
- Servomechanism
- Solenoid
- Stepper motor
- Shape-memory alloy
- Thermal bimorph
- Hydraulic actuators
- Trim actuator, in aircraft design

=== Rotary to linear conversion ===
Rotary motors are primarily used when rotational motion is required, but can also be used for linear applications by transforming rotary motion into linear motion with a lead screw or similar mechanism. On the other hand, some actuators are intrinsically linear, such as piezoelectric actuators. Conversion between circular and linear motion is commonly made via a few simple types of mechanism including:

- Screw: Screw jack, ball screw and roller screw actuators all operate on the principle of the simple machine known as the screw. By rotating the actuator's nut, the screw shaft moves in a line. By moving the screw shaft, the nut rotates.
- Wheel and axle: Hoist, winch, rack and pinion, chain drive, belt drive, rigid chain and rigid belt actuators operate on the principle of the wheel and axle. By rotating a wheel/axle (e.g. drum, gear, pulley or shaft) a linear member (e.g. cable, rack, chain or belt) moves. By moving the linear member, the wheel/axle rotates.

=== Virtual instrumentation ===
In virtual instrumentation, actuators and sensors are the hardware complements of virtual instruments.

== Performance metrics ==
Performance metrics for actuators include speed, acceleration, and force (alternatively, angular speed, angular acceleration, and torque), as well as energy efficiency and considerations such as mass, volume, operating conditions, and durability, among others.

=== Force ===
When considering force in actuators for applications, two main metrics should be considered. These two are static and dynamic loads. Static load is the force capability of the actuator while not in motion. Conversely, the dynamic load of the actuator is the force capability while in motion.

=== Speed ===
Speed should be considered primarily at a no-load pace, since the speed will invariably decrease as the load amount increases. The rate the speed will decrease will directly correlate with the amount of force and the initial speed.

=== Operating conditions ===
Actuators are commonly rated using the standard IP Code rating system. Those that are rated for dangerous environments will have a higher IP rating than those for personal or common industrial use.

=== Durability ===
This will be determined by each individual manufacturer, depending on usage and quality.

== See also ==
- End effector
- Hard disk drive actuator
- Linear actuator
- Load cell
- Microactuator
- Nanotube nanomotor
- Robot actuators
- Torque motor
