= Electrohydraulic servo valve =

Electrically-operated fluid valve

An electrohydraulic servo valve (EHSV) is an electrically-operated valve that controls how hydraulic fluid is sent to an actuator. Servo valves are often used to control powerful hydraulic cylinders with a very small electrical signal. Servo valves can provide precise control of position, velocity, pressure, and force with good post-movement damping characteristics.

== History of electrohydraulic servo valves ==
The electrohydraulic servo valve first appeared in World War II. The EHSVs in use during the 1940s were characterized by poor accuracy and slow response times due to the inability to rapidly convert electrical signals into hydraulic flows. The first two-stage servo valve used a solenoid to actuate a first stage spool which in turn drove a rotating main stage. The servo valves of the World War II-era were similar to this — using a solenoid to drive a spool valve.

Advancement of EHSVs took off in the 1950s, largely due to the adoption of permanent magnet torque motors as the first stage (as opposed to solenoids). This resulted in greatly improved response times and a reduction in power used to control the valves.

== Description ==
=== Types ===
Servo valve types

Single-stage servo valve

Two-stage servo valve

Electrohydraulic servo valves may consist of one or more stages. A single-stage servo valve uses a torque motor to directly position a spool valve. Single-stage servo valves suffer from limitations in flow capability and stability due to torque motor power requirements. Two-stage servo valves may use flapper, jet pipe, or deflector jet valves as hydraulic amplifier first stages to position a second-stage spool valve. This design results in significant increases in servo valve flow capability, stability, and force output. Similarly, three-stage servo valves may use an intermediate stage spool valve to position a larger third stage spool valve. Three-stage servo valves are limited to very high power applications, where significant flows are required.

Furthermore, two-stage servo valves may be classified by the type of feedback used for the second stage; which may be spool position, load pressure, or load flow feedback. Most commonly, two-stage servo valves use position feedback; which may further be classified by direct feedback, force feedback, or spring centering.

=== Control ===
A servo valve receives pressurized hydraulic fluid from a source, typically a hydraulic pump. It then transfers the fluid to a hydraulic cylinder in a closely controlled manner. Typically, the valve will move the spool proportionally to an electrical signal that it receives, indirectly controlling flow rate. Simple hydraulic control valves are binary, they are either on or off. Servo valves are different in that they can continuously vary the flow they supply from zero up to their rated maximum flow, or until the output pressure reaches the supplied pressure. More complex servo valves can control other parameters. For instance, some have internal feedback so that the input signal effectively control flow or output pressure, rather than spool position.

Servo valves are often used in a feedback control where the position or force on a hydraulic cylinder is measured, and fed back into a controller that varies the signal sent to the servo valve. This allows very precise control of the cylinder.

== Examples of usage ==
=== Manufacturing ===
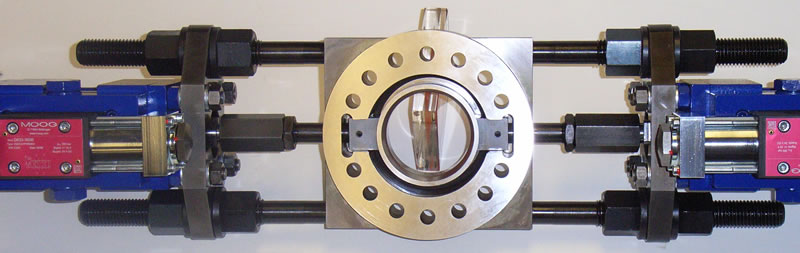
The twin Moog servo valves are used to deform the shape of the die on this blow molding accessory designed by BMC Controls Limited.

One example of servo valve use is in blow molding where the servo valve controls the wall thickness of extruded plastic making up the bottle or container by use of a deformable die. The mechanical feedback has been replaced by an electric feedback with a position transducer. Integrated electronics close the position loop for the spool. These valves are suitable for electrohydraulic position, velocity, pressure or force control systems with extremely high dynamic response requirements.

=== Aircraft ===
Servo valves are used to regulate the flow of fuel into a turbofan engine governed by FADEC. In fly-by-wire aircraft the control surfaces are often moved by servo valves connected to hydraulic cylinders. The signals to the servo valves are controlled by a flight control computer that receives commands from the pilot and monitors the flight of the aircraft.
