= Lead (engineering) =

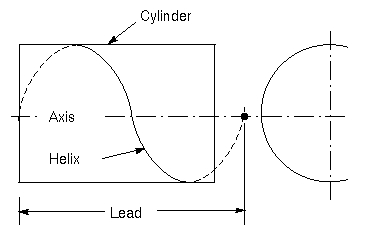
Definition of lead per ANSI/AGMA 1012-G05

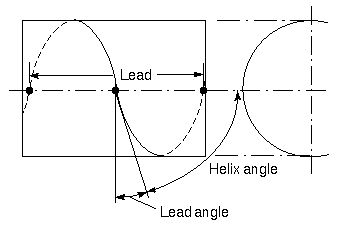
Definition of lead angle per ANSI/AGMA 1012-G05

Depiction of the lead angle of a screw thread. d_{m} is the mean diameter of the screw thread.

Lead is the axial advance of a helix or screw during one complete turn (360°) The lead for a screw thread is the axial travel for a single revolution.

Pitch is defined as the axial distance between adjacent threads on a helix or screw. In most screws, called "single start" screws, which have a single helical thread along their length, the lead and pitch are equal. They only differ in "multiple start" screws, which have several intertwined threads. In these screws, the lead is equal to the pitch multiplied by the number of "starts".

Lead angle is the angle between the helix and a plane of rotation. It is the complement of the helix angle, and is used for convenience in worms and hobs. It is understood to be at the standard pitch diameter unless otherwise specified.

The lead angle can be expressed as:

$$\mbox{Lead angle} = \arctan \left( \frac {l} {\pi d_m} \right)$$

where

l is lead of the helix
d_{m} is mean diameter of the helix

In American literature λ is used to notate the Lead Angle. In European literature, Υ (Greek letter gamma) may be used.

== See also ==
- List of gear nomenclature
- Leadscrew
