= Screw press =

Type of press

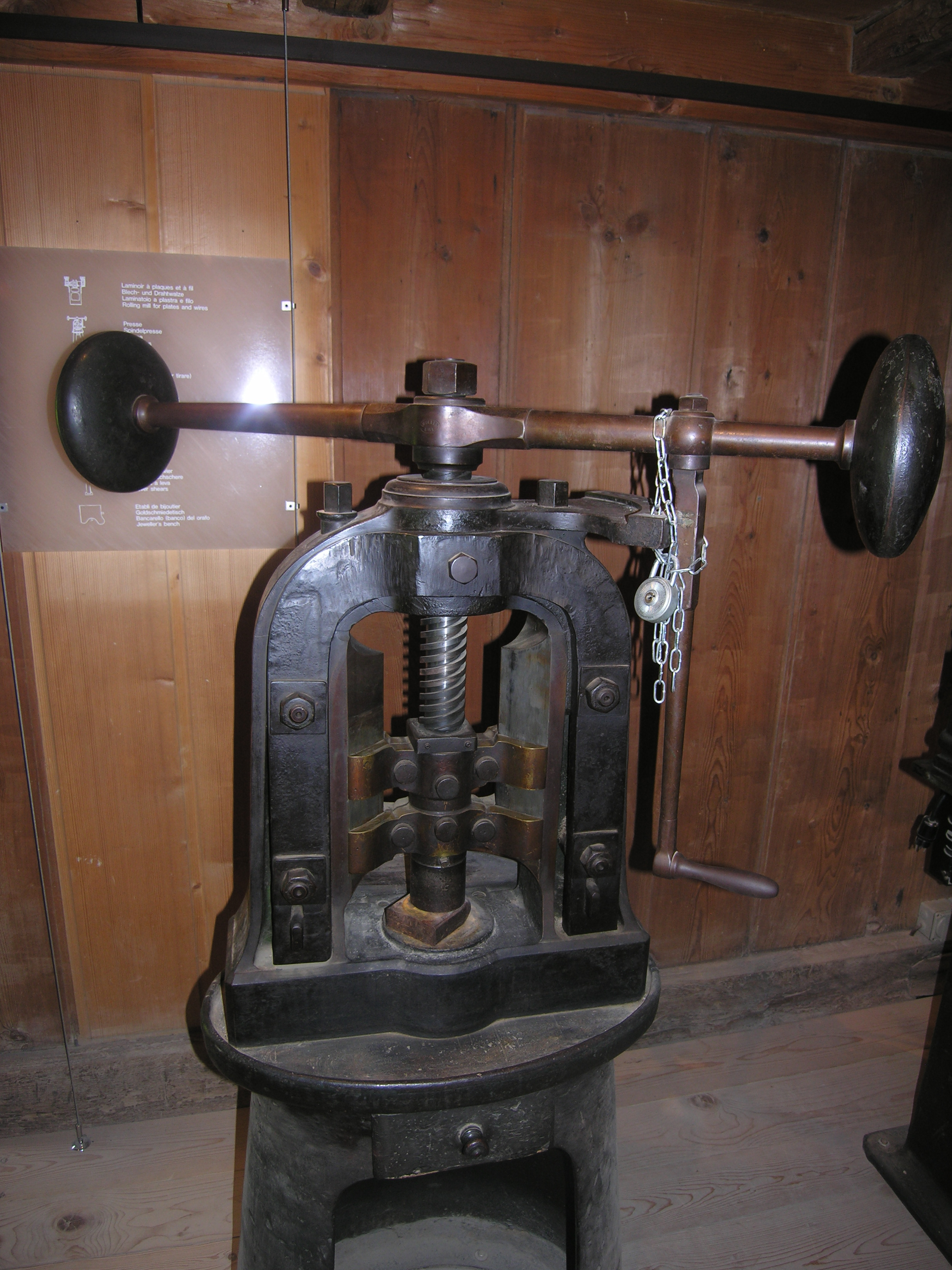
Ball-drive screw press

A screw press is a type of machine press in which the ram is driven up and down by a screw. The screw shaft can be driven by a handle or a wheel. It works by using a coarse screw to convert the rotation of the handle or drive-wheel into a small downward movement of greater force. The overhead handle usually incorporates balls as flyweights. The weights helps to maintain the momentum and thrust of the tool to make it easier to operate.

The screw press was first invented and used by the Romans in the first century AD. It was used primarily in wine and olive oil production. The screw press was also used in Gutenberg's printing press in the mid-15th century.

A press for metalworking is a machine tool used to shape or cut metal by deforming it with a die. It is frequently used to punch holes in sheet metal in one operation, rather than by cutting the hole or drilling.

A screw press is often used in hand book binding to help keep the covers of books flat and parallel to the text block while the glue is drying.

If used as a punch, the tool itself consists of a punch and a matching die, into which it very closely fits. Both are usually precision machined and then hardened. The material is introduced between the punch and die, and the machine operated. The punch will cut through the material in one movement by shearing it. The punch and die may be of any desired shape, so odd shaped holes and cutouts may be created.

If used as a forging tool, the dies can be many different shapes varying from flat to various shapes that will mold the metal to the desired configuration.

== Fly press ==
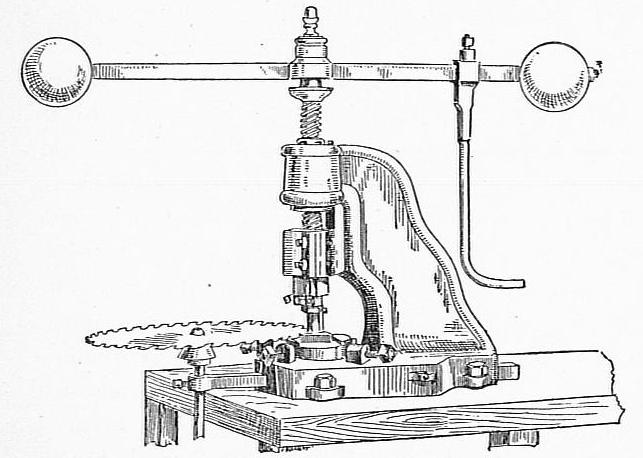
Fly press used for saw setting

A fly press is a type of screw press in which the screw shaft is driven by a flywheel or a pair of fly weights at the ends of a bar. The wheel can either be cranked by hand or driven by a motor using a friction coupling. The wheel is weighted so its momentum will maintain the motion of the shaft. A fly press which is operated by hand is the simplest of all presses, it consists of mass, handle, body, arm, screw, ram, stop collar, treads, and guides.

== Improvements ==
A planetary roller screw can provide about twice the maximum force as a screw press actuator using the same materials.
