= Torque motor =

Specialized DC electric motor

A torque motor is a specialized form of DC electric motor which can operate indefinitely while stalled, without incurring damage. In this mode of operation, the motor will apply a steady torque to the load (hence the name). A torque motor that cannot perform a complete rotation is known as a limited angle torque motor. Brushless torque motors are available; elimination of commutators and brushes allows higher speed operation.

== Construction ==
Torque motors normally use toroidal construction, allowing them to have wider diameter, more torque, and better dissipation of heat. They differ from other motors in their higher torque, thermal performance, and ability to operate while drawing high current in a stalled state.

== Linear versions ==
An analogous device, moving linearly rather than rotating, is described as a 'force motor'. These are widely used for refrigeration compressors and ultra-quiet air compressors, where the force motor produces simple harmonic motion in conjunction with a restoring spring.

== Applications ==
=== Tape recorders ===
A common application of a torque motor would be the supply- and take-up reel motors in a tape drive. In this application, driven from a low voltage, the characteristics of these motors allow a relatively constant light tension to be applied to the tape whether or not the capstan is feeding tape past the tape heads. Driven from a higher voltage (and so delivering a higher torque), the torque motors can also achieve fast-forward and rewind operation without requiring any additional mechanics such as gears or clutches.

=== Computer games ===
In the computer gaming world, torque motors are used in force feedback steering wheels.

=== Throttle control ===
Another common application is the control of the throttle of an internal combustion engine in conjunction with an electronic governor. In this usage, the motor works against a return spring to move the throttle in accordance with the output of the governor. The latter monitors engine speed by counting electrical pulses from the ignition system or from a magnetic pickup and, depending on the speed, makes small adjustments to the amount of current applied to the motor. If the engine starts to slow down relative to the desired speed, the current will be increased, the motor will develop more torque, pulling against the return spring and opening the throttle. Should the engine run too fast, the governor will reduce the current being applied to the motor, causing the return spring to pull back and close the throttle.

=== Actuators ===
Torque motors can be used as actuators for direct-drive mechanisms in some situations where otherwise geared electric motors would be used; for example, in motion control systems or servomechanisms. Actuators are hardware devices that converts the controller command signal into a change in a physical parameters.
