= Split nut =

Nut divided into two halves for moving along a screw without turning

A split nut is a nut that is split lengthwise into two pieces (opposed halves) so that its female thread may be opened and closed over the male thread of a bolt or leadscrew. This allows the nut, when open, to move along the screw without the screw turning (or, vice versa, to allow the screw to pass through the nut without turning). Then, when the nut is closed, it resumes the normal movement of a nut on a screw (in which axial travel is linked to rotational travel)

A split nut assembly is often used in positioning systems, for example in the leadscrew of a lathe. It is one of the machine elements that makes single-point threading practical on manual (non-CNC) lathes. The very earliest screw-cutting lathes (in the late 18th and early 19th centuries) did not have them, but within a few decades, split nuts were common on lathes.

The two halves of the nut have chamfered ends (60° to the axis), which helps the threads to find engagement during the closing action. Usually, the screw and nut are also oiled for lubrication. Such provisions prolong the service life of the threads by minimizing wear.

Split nuts work best with trapezoidal threads.

Split nuts may not engage and disengage with multi start threads due to the overlapping leads.
