= Ball screw =

Low-friction linear actuator

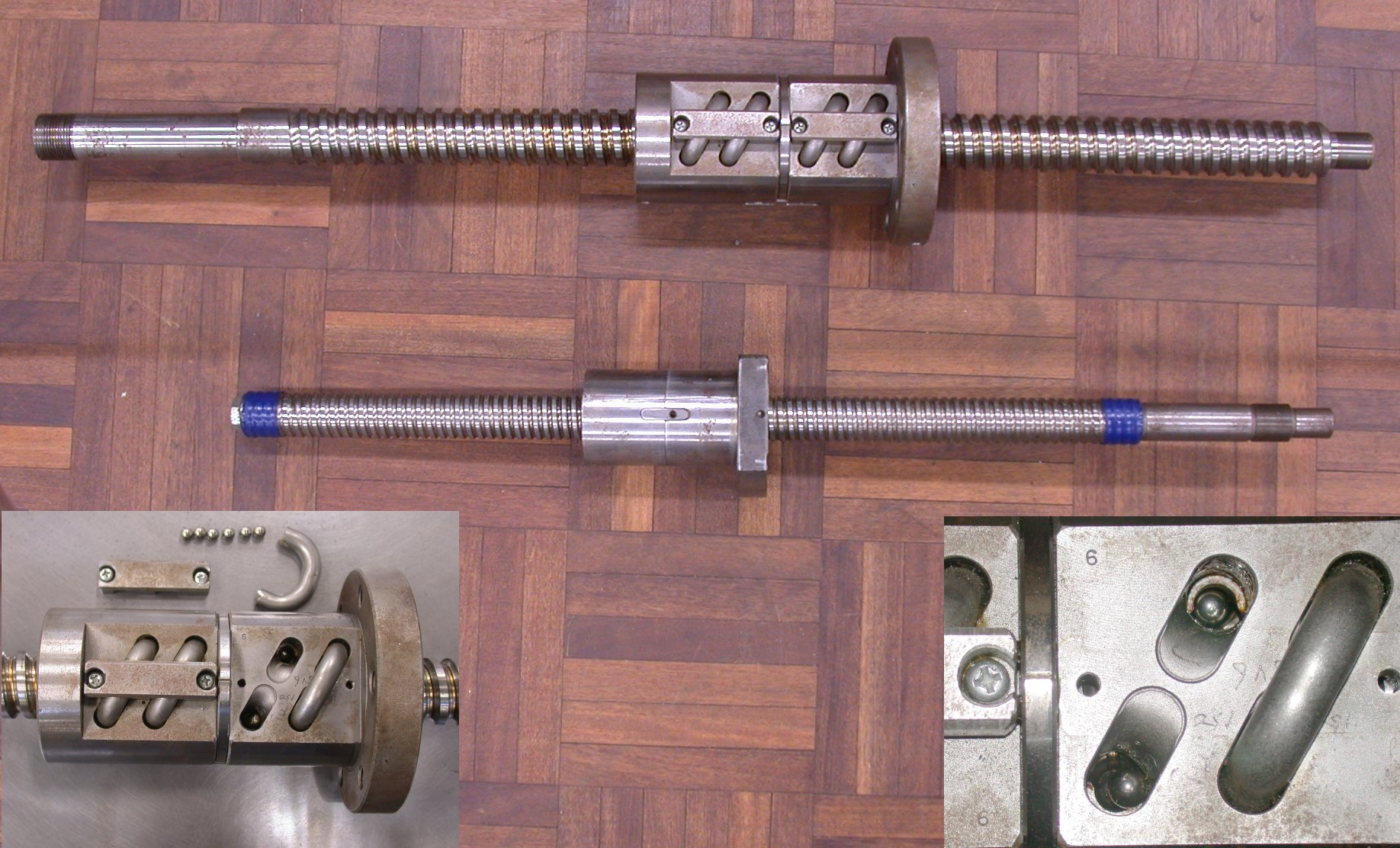
Two ball screws, including close-ups of the ball assembly of the top screw. Left inset: recirculating tube removed showing retainer bracket, loose balls and tube. Right inset: closer view of the nut cavity

A ball screw (or ballscrew) is a mechanical linear actuator that translates rotational motion to linear motion with little friction. A threaded shaft provides a helical raceway for ball bearings which act as a precision screw. As well as being able to apply or withstand high thrust loads, they can do so with minimum internal friction. They are made to close tolerances and are therefore suitable for high-precision applications. The ball assembly acts as the nut while the threaded shaft is the screw.

In contrast to conventional leadscrews, ball screws tend to be rather bulky, due to the need to have a mechanism to recirculate the balls.

== History ==
The ball screw was invented independently by H.M. Stevenson and D. Glenn who were issued in 1898 patents 601,451 and 610,044 respectively.

Early precise screwshafts were produced by starting with a low-precision screwshaft, and then lapping the shaft with several spring-loaded nut laps.. By rearranging and inverting the nut laps, the lengthwise errors of the nuts and shaft were averaged. Then, the repeatable pitch shaft's pitch is measured against a distance standard. A similar process is sometimes used today to produce reference standard screw shafts and to master manufacturing screw shafts.

== Design ==
Low friction in ball screws yields high mechanical efficiency compared to alternatives. A typical ball screw may be 90 percent efficient, versus 20 to 25 percent efficiency of an Acme lead screw of equal size. Lack of sliding friction between the nut and screw lends itself to extended lifespan of the screw assembly (especially in no-backlash systems), reducing downtime for maintenance and parts replacement, while also decreasing demand for lubrication. This, combined with their overall performance benefits and reduced power requirements, may offset the initial costs of using ball screws.

Ball screws may also reduce or eliminate the backlash common in lead screw and nut combinations. The balls may be preloaded so that there is no "wiggle" between the ball screw and ball nut. This is particularly desirable in applications where the load on the screw varies quickly, such as machine tools.

Because of their high mechanical efficiency, especially compared to traditional lead screws, ball screws can potentially be back-driven (that is, a linear force applied directly to the nut can induce a rotation of the shaft, an effect counterproductive to most uses). While this is usually of limited consequence to motorized applications, and potentially even provides a mild protective effect in some cases, it makes them generally unsuitable for application in manually actuated systems, such as hand-fed machine tools. The static torque and digital control of an appropriate servomotor can be made to resist and compensate, but hand cranked mechanisms would require additional mechanisms to prevent undesirable behaviors. Such undesirable behavior could range from simple loss of control of the machine, such as self-feeding (the tool of the machine causing motion of the axes without the control input of the operator), to potentially dangerous cases where unexpected force could be transmitted all the way to an operator's limbs and pose a risk of injury. Because an ordinary lead screw resists or even prohibits such reverse operation, they are inherently safer and more reliable for manual use. The magnitude of force needed to consequentially back-drive an Acme lead screw would usually be sufficient to destroy the mechanism, immobilizing the machine and absorbing any dangerous force before it could pose a risk to an operator.

The circulating balls travel inside the thread form of the screw and nut, and balls are recirculated through various types of return mechanisms. If the ball nut did not have a return mechanism, then the balls would fall out of the end of the ball nut when they reached the end of the nut. For this reason several different recirculation methods have been developed. An external ballnut employs a stamped tube which picks up balls from the raceway by use of a small pick-up finger. Balls travel inside the tube and are then replaced back into the thread raceway. An internal-button ballnut employs a machined or cast button-style return which allows balls to exit the raceway track and move one thread then reenter the raceway. An endcap return ball nut employs a cap on the end of the ball nut. The cap is machined to pick up balls coming out of the end of the nut and direct them down holes which are bored transversely down the ballnut. The complement cap on the other side of the nut directs balls back into the raceway. The returning balls are not under significant mechanical load and the return path may incorporate injection-moulded low-friction plastic parts.

A ball screw involves significantly more parts and surface interactions than many similar systems. While a basic lead screw is composed of only a solid shaft and a solid nut with simple mating geometries, a ball screw requires precisely formed curved contours and multi-part assemblies to facilitate the action of the bearing balls. This makes them more expensive to manufacture and sometimes to maintain, and provides more potential avenues for failure if the apparatus is not properly cared for.

== Equations ==
$$T=\frac{Fl}{2\pi\nu}$$

with the rotary input driving in the conventional way, or

$$F=\frac{2\pi\nu T}{l}$$

if the linear force is backdriving the system.

In these equations, $\mathit{T}$ is the torque applied to screw or nut, $\mathit{F}$ is the linear force applied, $\mathit{l}$ is the ball screw lead, and $\nu$ is the ball screw efficiency. Selection of the standard to be used is an agreement between the supplier and the user and has some significance in the design of the screw. In the United States, ASME has developed the B5.48-1977 Standard entitled "Ball Screws".

The correct evaluation of the curvatures of ball screw grooves allows one to accurately design the constructive parameters of this mechanism and to enhance its performance. The formulation commonly used in literature refers to the ball bearing's geometry, ignoring the shape of the section's profile and the helix angle. In particular, the first principal curvature is calculated as
$$\kappa_{1s} = \frac{\cos(\varphi)}{r_m-r_b\cos(\varphi)}$$
for the screw shaft groove, and as
$$\kappa_{1n} = -\frac{\cos(\varphi)}{r_m+r_b\cos(\varphi)}$$
for the nut groove, where φ is the contact angle, $r_m$ is the pitch circle radius, and $r_b$ is the ball radius. The second principal curvature is simply
$$\kappa_{2s} = -\frac{1}{2f_sr_b}$$
for the screw shaft groove and
$$\kappa_{2n} = -\frac{1}{2f_nr_b}$$
for the nut groove, where $f_s$ and $f_n$ are, respectively, the conformity factors of the groove profiles of the screw shaft and nut. These formulations do not take into account the shape of the groove profiles and the presence of the helix angle: more recent publications found the exact solution for the curvature of the grooves of screw shaft and nut. A new research proposes a new formulation which approximates the real curvature values with a maximum relative error of approximately 0.5%. Therefore, a much more precise formula for the first principal curvature of the screw shaft groove is
$$\kappa_{1s} = \frac{\cos(\varphi)\cos^2(\alpha_e)}{r_m-r_b\cos(\varphi)\cos^2(\alpha_e)}$$
and
$$\kappa_{1n} = -\frac{\cos(\varphi)\cos^2(\alpha_e)}{r_m+r_b\cos(\varphi)\cos^2(\alpha_e)}$$
for the nut groove, where $\alpha_e=\arctan\left(\frac{l}{2\pi r_m}\right)$ is the helix angle.

== Operation ==
To maintain their inherent accuracy and ensure long life, great care is needed to avoid contamination with dirt and abrasive particles. This may be achieved by using rubber or leather bellows to completely or partially enclose the working surfaces. Another solution is to use a positive pressure of filtered air when they are used in a semi-sealed or open enclosure.

While reducing friction, ball screws can operate with some preload, effectively eliminating backlash (slop) between input (rotation) and output (linear motion). This feature is essential when they are used in computer-controlled motion-control systems, such as CNC machine tools and high precision motion applications (such as wire bonding).

To obtain proper rolling action of the balls, as in a standard ball bearing, it is necessary that, when loaded in one direction, the ball makes contact at one point with the nut, and one point with the screw. In practice, most ball screws are designed to be lightly preloaded, so that there is at least a slight load on the ball at four points, two in contact with the nut and two in contact with the screw. This is accomplished by using a thread profile that has a slightly larger radius than the ball, the difference in radii being kept small (for example, a simple V thread with flat faces is unsuitable) so that elastic deformation around the point of contact allows a small, but non-zero, contact area to be obtained, like any other rolling element bearing. To this end, the threads are usually machined as a "gothic arch" profile. If a simple semicircular thread profile were used, contact would only be at two points, on the outer and inner edges, which would not resist axial loading.

To remove backlash and obtain the optimum stiffness and wear characteristics for a given application, a controlled amount of preload is usually applied. This is accomplished in some cases by machining the components such that the balls are a "tight" fit when assembled; however, this gives poor control of the preload, and cannot be adjusted to allow for wear. It is more common to design the ball nut as effectively two separate nuts which are tightly coupled mechanically, with adjustment by either rotating one nut with respect to the other, so creating a relative axial displacement, or by retaining both nuts tightly together axially and rotating one with respect to the other, so that its set of balls is displaced axially to create the preload.

== Manufacture ==
Ball screw shafts may be fabricated by rolling, yielding a less precise but inexpensive and mechanically efficient product. Rolled ball screws have a positional precision of several thousandths of an inch per foot.

Ball screws are classified using "accuracy grades" from C0 (most precise) to C10. High-precision screw shafts are typically precise to one thousandth of an inch per foot (830 nm/cm) or better. They have historically been machined to gross shape, case-hardened, and then ground. The three-step process is needed because high-temperature machining distorts the workpiece. Hard whirling is a recent (2008) precision machining technique that minimizes heating of the work, and can produce precision screws from case-hardened bar stock. Instrument-quality screw shafts are typically precise to 250 nanometers per centimeter. They are produced on precision milling machines with optical distance measuring equipment and special tooling. Similar machines are used to produce optical lenses and mirrors. Instrument screw shafts are generally made of Invar, to prevent temperature from changing tolerances too much.

== Applications ==
Ball screws are used in aircraft and missiles to move control surfaces, especially for electric fly by wire, and in automobile power steering to translate rotary motion from an electric motor to axial motion of the steering rack. They are also used in machine tools, robots, and precision assembly equipment. High-precision ball screws are used in steppers for semiconductor manufacturing.

A ball screw is used to expand the Deployable Tower Assembly (DTA) structure on the James Webb Space Telescope.

A ball screw is also planned to be used in TerraPower's Natrium reactor as part of its Control rod drive mechanism.

In 2026 it was assessed that precision ball screws have become a bottleneck (production) for the defense industry of the United States.

== Similar systems ==
Another form of linear actuator based on a rotating rod is the threadless ballscrew, or "rolling ring drive". In this design, three or more rolling-ring bearings are arranged symmetrically in a housing surrounding a smooth (threadless) actuator rod or shaft. The bearings are set at an angle to the rod, and this angle determines the direction and rate of linear motion per revolution of the rod. An advantage of this design over the conventional ballscrew or leadscrew is the practical elimination of backlash and loading caused by preload nuts.

== See also ==
- Ball spline – Mechanical bearing designed to provide free motion in one direction
- Jackscrew – Mechanical lifting device operated by turning a leadscrew
- Leadscrew – Screw used as a linkage in a mechanism
- Linear actuator – Actuator that creates motion in a straight line
- Linear-motion bearing – Mechanical bearing designed to provide free motion in one direction
- Recirculating ball – Vehicle steering mechanism
- Roller screw – Low-friction precision screw-type actuatorr
