= Linear motor =

Electric motor that produces a linear force

Free-body diagram of a U-channel synchronous linear motor. The view is perpendicular to the channel axis. The two coils at centre are mechanically connected, and are energized in "quadrature" (meaning a phase difference of 90° (π/2 radians) between the flux of the magnets and the flux of the coils). The bottom and upper coils in this particular case have a phase difference of 90°, making this a two-phase motor (not to scale).

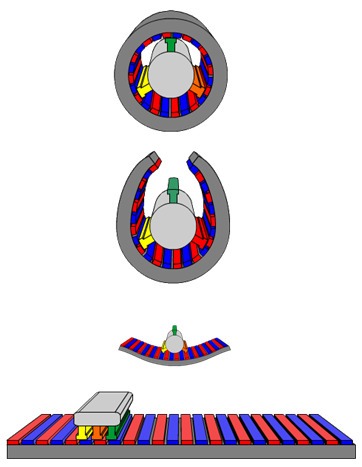
Synchronous linear motors are straightened versions of permanent magnet rotor motors.

A linear motor is an electric motor that has had its stator and rotor "unrolled", thus it produces a linear force along its length, rather than a rotational force (torque). However, linear motors are not necessarily straight. Characteristically, a linear motor's active section has ends, whereas more conventional motors are arranged as a continuous loop.

Linear motors are used by the millions in high accuracy CNC machining and in industrial robots. In 2024, the market for linear motors was valued at 1.8 billion USD.

A typical mode of operation is as a Lorentz-type actuator, in which the applied force is linearly proportional to the current and the magnetic field $(\vec F = I \vec L \times \vec B)$.

Many designs have been put forward for linear motors, falling into two major categories, low-acceleration and high-acceleration linear motors. Low-acceleration linear motors are suitable for maglev trains and other ground-based transportation applications. High-acceleration linear motors are normally rather short, and are designed to accelerate an object to a very high speed; for example, see the coilgun.

High-acceleration linear motors are used in studies of hypervelocity collisions, as weapons, or as mass drivers for spacecraft propulsion. They are usually of the AC linear induction motor (LIM) design with an active three-phase winding on one side of the air-gap and a passive conductor plate on the other side. However, the direct current homopolar linear motor railgun is another high acceleration linear motor design. The low-acceleration, high speed and high power motors are usually of the linear synchronous motor (LSM) design, with an active winding on one side of the air-gap and an array of alternate-pole magnets on the other side. These magnets can be permanent magnets or electromagnets. The motor for the Shanghai maglev train, for instance, is an LSM.

== Types ==
=== Brushless ===
Brushless linear motors are members of the Synchronous motor family. They are typically used in standard linear stages or integrated into custom, high performance positioning systems. Invented in the late 1980s by Anwar Chitayat at Anorad Corporation, now Rockwell Automation, and helped improve the throughput and quality of industrial manufacturing processes.

=== Brush ===
Brushed linear motors were used in industrial automation applications prior to the invention of Brushless linear motors. Compared with three-phase brushless motors, which are typically being used today, brush motors operate on a single phase. Brush linear motors have a lower cost since they do not need moving cables or three-phase servo drives. However, they require higher maintenance since their brushes wear out.

=== Synchronous ===
In this design the rate of movement of the magnetic field is controlled, usually electronically, to track the motion of the rotor. For cost reasons synchronous linear motors rarely use commutators, so the rotor often contains permanent magnets, or soft iron. Examples include coilguns and the motors used on some maglev systems, as well as many other linear motors. In high precision industrial automation linear motors are typically configured with a magnet stator and a moving coil. A Hall-effect sensor is attached to the rotor to track the magnetic flux of the stator. The electric current is typically provided from a stationary servo drive to the moving coil by a moving cable inside a cable carrier.

=== Induction ===
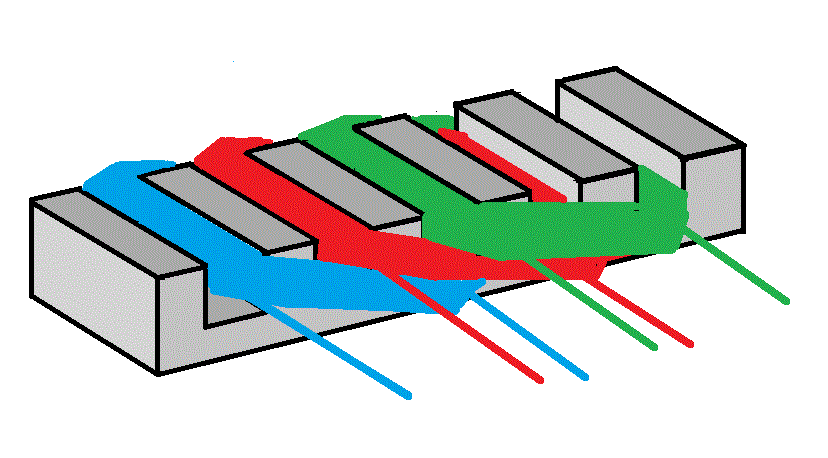
A typical 3-phase linear induction motor. An aluminium plate on top often forms the secondary "rotor".

In this design, the force is produced by a moving linear magnetic field acting on conductors in the field. Any conductor, be it a loop, a coil or simply a piece of plate metal, that is placed in this field will have eddy currents induced in it thus creating an opposing magnetic field, in accordance with Lenz's law. The two opposing fields will repel each other, thus creating motion as the magnetic field sweeps through the metal.

=== Homopolar ===
Railgun schematic

In this design a large current is passed through a metal sabot across sliding contacts that are fed by two rails. The magnetic field this generates causes the metal to be projected along the rails.

=== Tubular ===
Efficient and compact design applicable to the replacement of pneumatic cylinders.

=== Piezoelectric ===
Piezoelectric motor action

Piezoelectric drive is often used to drive small linear motors.

== History ==
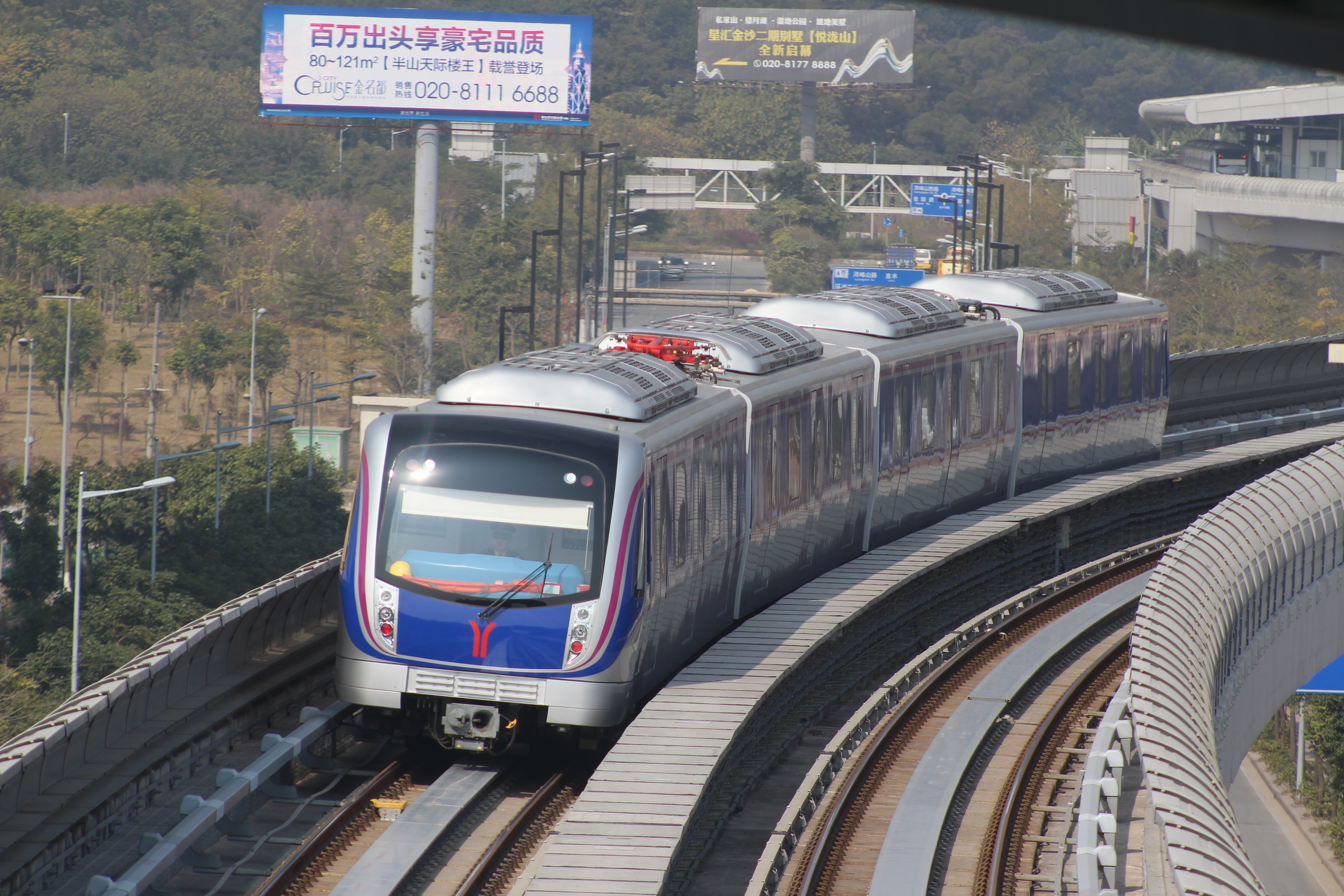
This Line 6 Guangzhou Metro train manufactured by CRRC Sifang and Kawasaki Heavy Industries propels itself using an aluminium induction strip placed between the rails.

=== Low acceleration ===
The history of linear electric motors can be traced back at least as far as the 1840s, to the work of Charles Wheatstone at King's College London, but Wheatstone's model was too inefficient to be practical. A feasible linear induction motor is described in U.S. patent 782,312 (1905 - inventor Alfred Zehden of Frankfurt-am-Main), for driving trains or lifts. The German engineer Hermann Kemper built a working model in 1935. In the late 1940s, Dr. Eric Laithwaite of Manchester University, later Professor of Heavy Electrical Engineering at Imperial College in London developed the first full-size working model.

In a single sided version the magnetic repulsion forces the conductor away from the stator, levitating it, and carrying it along in the direction of the moving magnetic field. He called the later versions of it magnetic river. The technologies would later be applied, in the 1984, Air-Rail Link shuttle, between Birmingham's airport and an adjacent train station.

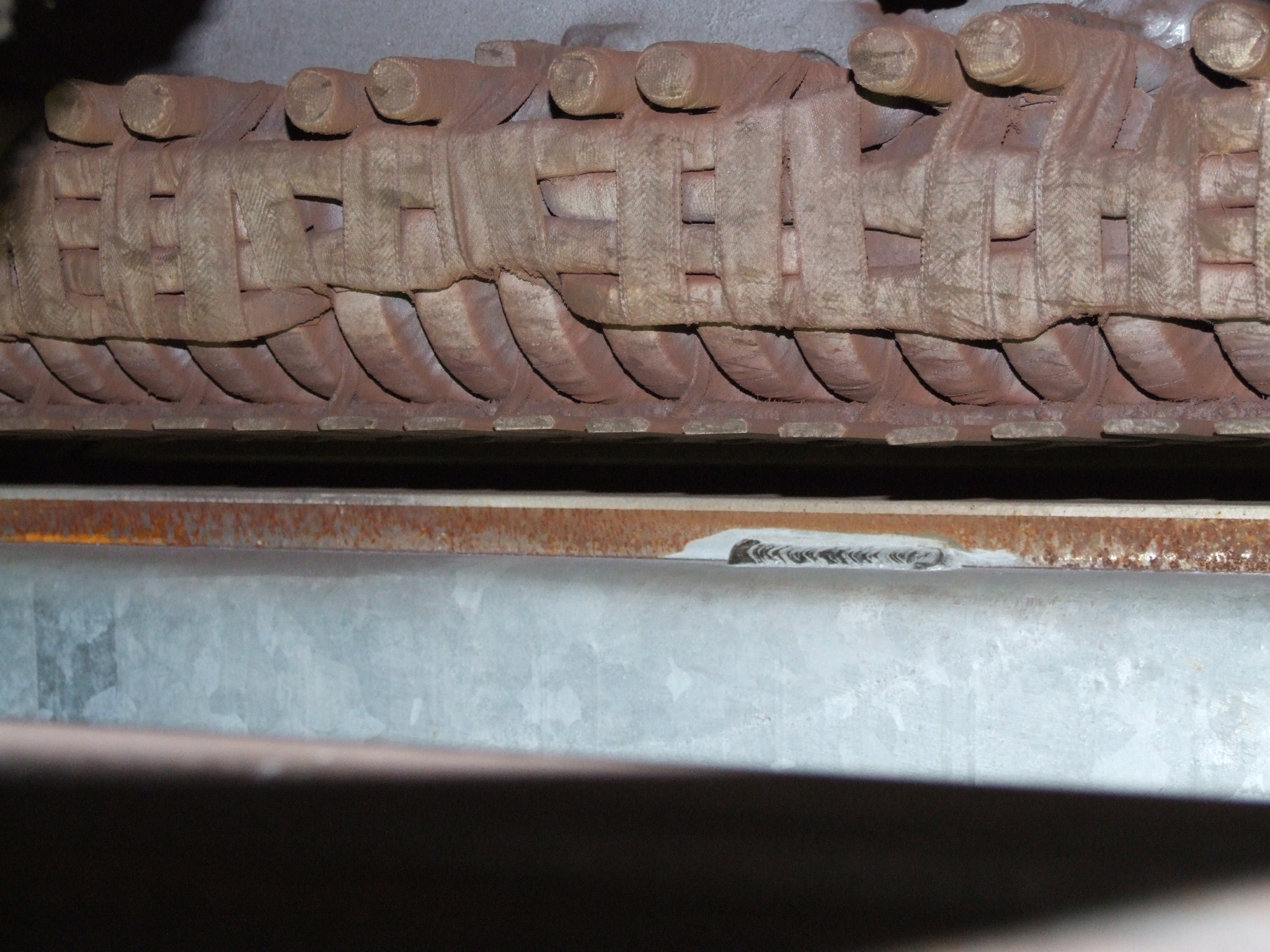
A linear motor for trains running Toei Ōedo Line

Because of these properties, linear motors are often used in maglev propulsion, as in the Japanese Linimo magnetic levitation train line near Nagoya. However, linear motors have been used independently of magnetic levitation, as in the Bombardier Innovia Metro systems worldwide and a number of modern Japanese subways, including Tokyo's Toei Ōedo Line.

Similar technology is also used in some roller coasters with modifications but, at present, is still impractical on street running trams, although this, in theory, could be done by burying it in a slotted conduit.

Outside of public transportation, vertical linear motors have been proposed as lifting mechanisms in deep mines, and the use of linear motors is growing in motion control applications. They are also often used on sliding doors, such as those of low floor trams such as the Alstom Citadis and the Socimi Eurotram. Dual axis linear motors also exist. These specialized devices have been used to provide direct X-Y motion for precision laser cutting of cloth and sheet metal, automated drafting, and cable forming. Most linear motors in use are LIM (linear induction motor), or LSM (linear synchronous motor). Linear DC motors are not used due to their higher cost and linear SRM suffers from poor thrust. So for long runs in traction LIM is mostly preferred and for short runs LSM is mostly preferred.

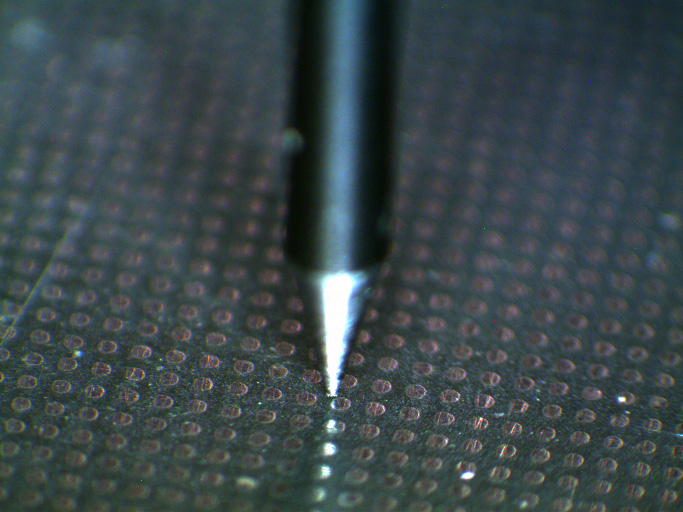
Close-up of the flat passive conductor surface of a motion control Sawyer motor

=== High acceleration ===
High-acceleration linear motors have been suggested for a number of uses. They have been considered for use as weapons, since current armour-piercing ammunition tends to consist of small rounds with very high kinetic energy, for which just such motors are suitable. Many amusement park launched roller coasters now use linear synchronous motors to propel the train at a high speed, as an alternative to using a lift hill.

The United States Navy is also using linear induction motors in the Electromagnetic Aircraft Launch System that will replace traditional steam catapults on future aircraft carriers. They have also been suggested for use in spacecraft propulsion. In this context they are usually called mass drivers. The simplest way to use mass drivers for spacecraft propulsion would be to build a large mass driver that can accelerate cargo up to escape velocity, though RLV launch assist like StarTram to low Earth orbit has also been investigated.

High-acceleration linear motors are difficult to design for a number of reasons. They require large amounts of energy in very short periods of time. One rocket launcher design calls for 300 GJ for each launch in the space of less than a second. Normal electrical generators are not designed for this kind of load, but short-term electrical energy storage methods can be used. Capacitors are bulky and expensive but can supply large amounts of energy quickly. Homopolar generators can be used to convert the kinetic energy of a flywheel into electric energy very rapidly. High-acceleration linear motors also require very strong magnetic fields; in fact, the magnetic fields are often too strong to permit the use of superconductors. However, with careful design, this need not be a major problem.

Two different basic designs have been invented for high-acceleration linear motors: railguns and coilguns.

== Usage ==
Linear motors are widely used to actuate high-performance industrial automation equipment. Their principal advantage is the ability to deliver any combination of high precision, high velocity, high force, and long travel. Compared to traditional rotary motor and screw-driven systems, linear motors offer direct-drive operation, eliminating backlash and reducing maintenance requirements.

One of the earliest industrial applications of linear motors was in looms, where they were used to propel the shuttle rapidly across the weave. In modern settings, linear motors are extensively deployed in CNC machines, pick-and-place systems, semiconductor steppers, and high-speed cartesian coordinate robots.

Linear motors are also used in consumer and infrastructure applications. These include powering sliding doors, baggage handling systems, and large-scale bulk materials transport systems such as conveyor belts or transfer carts.

In large observatory telescopes, such as the European Extremely Large Telescope (ELT), hybrid actuators combining linear motors and piezoelectric elements are employed for precise positioning of mirror segments. These actuators offer high force and nanometer-level precision, essential for maintaining the optical alignment of the telescope's segmented primary mirror.

Linear motors may also be used as an alternative to conventional chain-run lift hills for roller coasters. The coaster Maverick at Cedar Point uses one such linear motor in place of a chain lift.

A linear motor has been used to accelerate cars for crash tests.

=== Industrial automation ===
The combination of high precision, high velocity, high force, and long travel makes brushless linear motors attractive for driving industrial automations equipment. They serve industries and applications such as semiconductor steppers, electronics surface-mount technology, automotive cartesian coordinate robots, aerospace chemical milling, optics electron microscope, healthcare laboratory automation, food and beverage pick and place.

=== Machine tools ===
Synchronous linear motor actuators, used in machine tools and industrial automation, provide high force, high velocity, high precision, and high dynamic stiffness. These characteristics enable zero-backlash motion, low settling time, and exceptional smoothness of movement. Modern systems can achieve velocities of 2 m/s or more, with micron-level positioning accuracy and fast cycle times, contributing to superior surface finishes and throughput.

=== Simulation and training devices ===
Haptech Inc. uses electromagnetic linear motors in a proprietary application for military weapons training that provides high-fidelity & cost-effective instruction to soldiers. These motors provide realistic recoil and other haptic feedback to the training devices which enhance the experience while offering precise simulation for training purposes. For their use in military training, these products are the only viable electronic solution that does not force users to adapt to the training device.

=== Train propulsion ===
==== Conventional rails ====
All of the following applications are in rapid transit and have the active part of the motor in the cars.

===== Bombardier Innovia Metro =====
Originally developed in the late 1970s by UTDC in Canada as the Intermediate Capacity Transit System (ICTS). A test track was constructed in Millhaven, Ontario, for extensive testing of prototype cars, after which three lines were constructed:

- Line 3 Scarborough in Toronto (opened 1985; closed 2023)
- Expo Line of the Vancouver SkyTrain (opened 1985 and extended in 1994)
- Detroit People Mover in Detroit (opened 1987)

ICTS was sold to Bombardier Transportation in 1991 and later known as Advanced Rapid Transit (ART) before adopting its current branding in 2011. Since then, several more installations have been made:

- Kelana Jaya Line in Kuala Lumpur (opened 1998 and extended in 2016)
- Millennium Line of the Vancouver SkyTrain (opened 2002 and extended in 2016)
- AirTrain JFK in New York (opened 2003)
- Airport Express (Beijing Subway) (opened 2008)
- Everline in Yongin, South Korea (opened 2013)

All Innovia Metro systems use third rail electrification.

===== Japanese linear metro =====
One of the biggest challenges faced by Japanese railway engineers in the 1970s to the 1980s was the ever increasing construction costs of subways. In response, the Japan Subway Association began studying on the feasibility of the "mini-metro" for meeting urban traffic demand in 1979. In 1981, the Japan Railway Engineering Association studied on the use of linear induction motors for such small-profile subways and by 1984 was investigating on the practical applications of linear motors for urban rail with the Japanese Ministry of Land, Infrastructure, Transport and Tourism. In 1988, a successful demonstration was made with the Limtrain at Saitama and influenced the eventual adoption of the linear motor for the Nagahori Tsurumi-ryokuchi Line in Osaka and Toei Line 12 (present-day Toei Oedo Line) in Tokyo.

To date, the following subway lines in Japan use linear motors and use overhead lines for power collection:

- Two Osaka Metro lines in Osaka:
  - Nagahori Tsurumi-ryokuchi Line (opened 1990)
  - Imazatosuji Line (opened 2006)
- Toei Ōedo Line in Tokyo (opened 2000)
- Kaigan Line of the Kobe Municipal Subway (opened 2001)
- Nanakuma Line of the Fukuoka City Subway (opened 2005)
- Green Line of the Yokohama Municipal Subway (opened 2008)
- Tōzai Line of the Sendai Subway (opened 2015)

In addition, Kawasaki Heavy Industries has also exported the Linear Metro to the Guangzhou Metro in China; all of the Linear Metro lines in Guangzhou use third rail electrification:

- Line 4 (opened 2005)
- Line 5 (opened 2009).
- Line 6 (opened 2013)

==== Monorail ====
- There is at least one known monorail system which is not magnetically levitated, but nonetheless uses linear motors. This is the Moscow Monorail. Originally, traditional motors and wheels were to be used. However, it was discovered during test runs that the proposed motors and wheels would fail to provide adequate traction under some conditions, for example, when ice appeared on the rail. Hence, wheels are still used, but the trains use linear motors to accelerate and slow down. This is possibly the only use of such a combination, due to the lack of such requirements for other train systems.
- The TELMAGV is a prototype of a monorail system that is also not magnetically levitated but uses linear motors.

==== Magnetic levitation ====
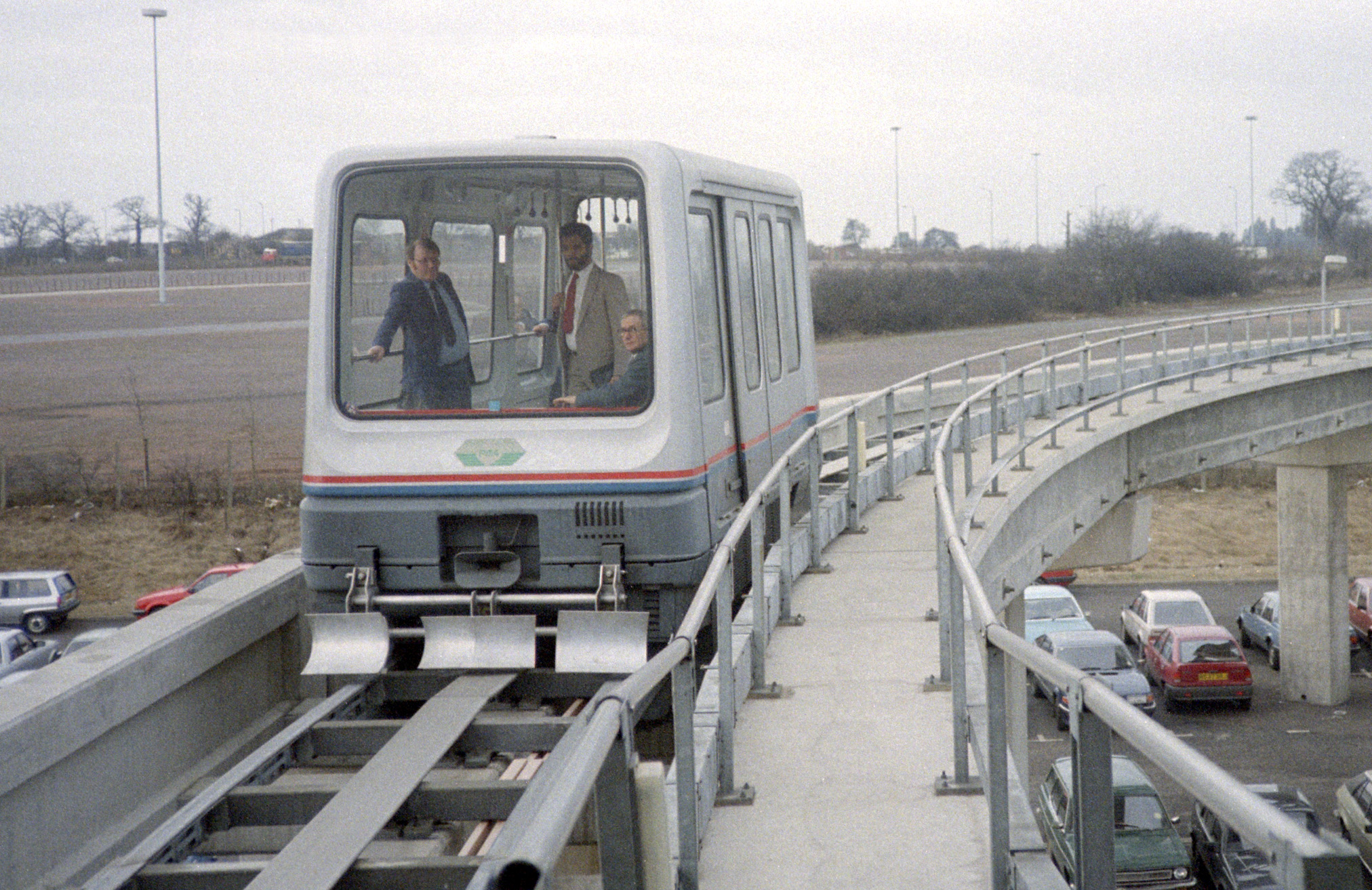
The Birmingham International Maglev shuttle

- High-speed trains:
  - Transrapid: first commercial use in Shanghai (opened in 2004)
  - SCMaglev, under construction in Japan (fastest train in the world, planned to open by 2027)
- Rapid transit:
  - Birmingham Airport, UK (opened 1984, closed 1995)
  - M-Bahn in Berlin, Germany (opened in 1989, closed in 1991)
  - Daejeon EXPO, Korea (ran only 1993)
  - HSST: Linimo line in Aichi Prefecture, Japan (opened 2005)
  - Incheon Airport Maglev (opened July 2014)
  - Changsha Maglev Express (opened 2016)
  - S1 line of Beijing Subway (opened 2017)

=== Amusement rides ===
There are many roller coasters throughout the world that use LIMs to accelerate the ride vehicles. The first being Flight of Fear at Kings Island and Kings Dominion, both opening in 1996. Battlestar Galactica: Human VS Cylon & Revenge of the Mummy at Universal Studios Singapore opened in 2010. They both use LIMs to accelerate from certain point in the rides.

Revenge of the Mummy (located at both Universal Studios Hollywood and Universal Studios Florida), Hagrid's Magical Creatures Motorbike Adventure, and VelociCoaster at Universal Islands of Adventure use linear motors. At Walt Disney World, Rock 'n' Roller Coaster Starring Aerosmith at Disney's Hollywood Studios and Guardians of the Galaxy: Cosmic Rewind at Epcot both use LSM to launch their ride vehicles into their indoor ride enclosures.

In 2023 a hydraulic launch roller coaster, Top Thrill Dragster at Cedar Point in Ohio, USA, was renovated and the hydraulic launch replaced with a weaker multi-launch system using LSM, that creates less g-force.

=== Aircraft launching ===
- Electromagnetic Aircraft Launch System

=== Proposed and research ===
- Launch loop – A proposed system for launching vehicles into space using a linear motor powered loop
- StarTram – Concept for a linear motor on extreme scale
- Tether cable catapult system
- Aérotrain S44 – A suburban commuter hovertrain prototype
- Research Test Vehicle 31 – A hovercraft-type vehicle guided by a track
- Hyperloop – a conceptual high-speed transportation system put forward by entrepreneur Elon Musk
- Elevator "ThyssenKrupp Elevator: ThyssenKrupp develops the world's first rope-free elevator system to enable the building industry face the challenges of global urbanization". Archived from the original on 2016-03-03.
- Lift "Technology: Linear Synchronous Motor Elevators Become a Reality". Archived from the original on 2015-03-30.
- Magway - a UK freight delivery system under research and development that aims to deliver goods in pods via 90 cm diameter pipework under and over ground.

== See also ==
- Linear actuator
- Linear induction motor
- Linear motion
- Maglev
- Online Electric Vehicle
- Reciprocating electric motor
- Sawyer motor
- Tubular linear motor
