= Segmented spindle =

A segmented spindle, also known by the trademark Kataka, is a specialized mechanical linear actuator conceived by the Danish mechanical engineer Jens Joerren Soerensen during the mid-1990s. The actuator forms a telescoping tubular column, or spindle, from linked segments resembling curved parallelograms. The telescoping linear actuator has a lifting capacity up to 200 kg (~440 pounds) for a travel of 400 mm (~15.75 inches).

A short elongated housing forms the base of the actuator and includes an electrical gear drive and storage magazine for the spindle segments. The drive spins a helically grooved wheel that engages the similarly grooved inside face of the spindle segments. As the wheel spins it simultaneously pull the segments from their horizontal arrangement in the magazine and stacks them along the vertical path of a helix into a rigid tubular column. The reverse process lowers the column.

== See also ==
- Helical band actuator
- Rigid belt actuator
- Rigid chain actuator
