= Helical band actuator =

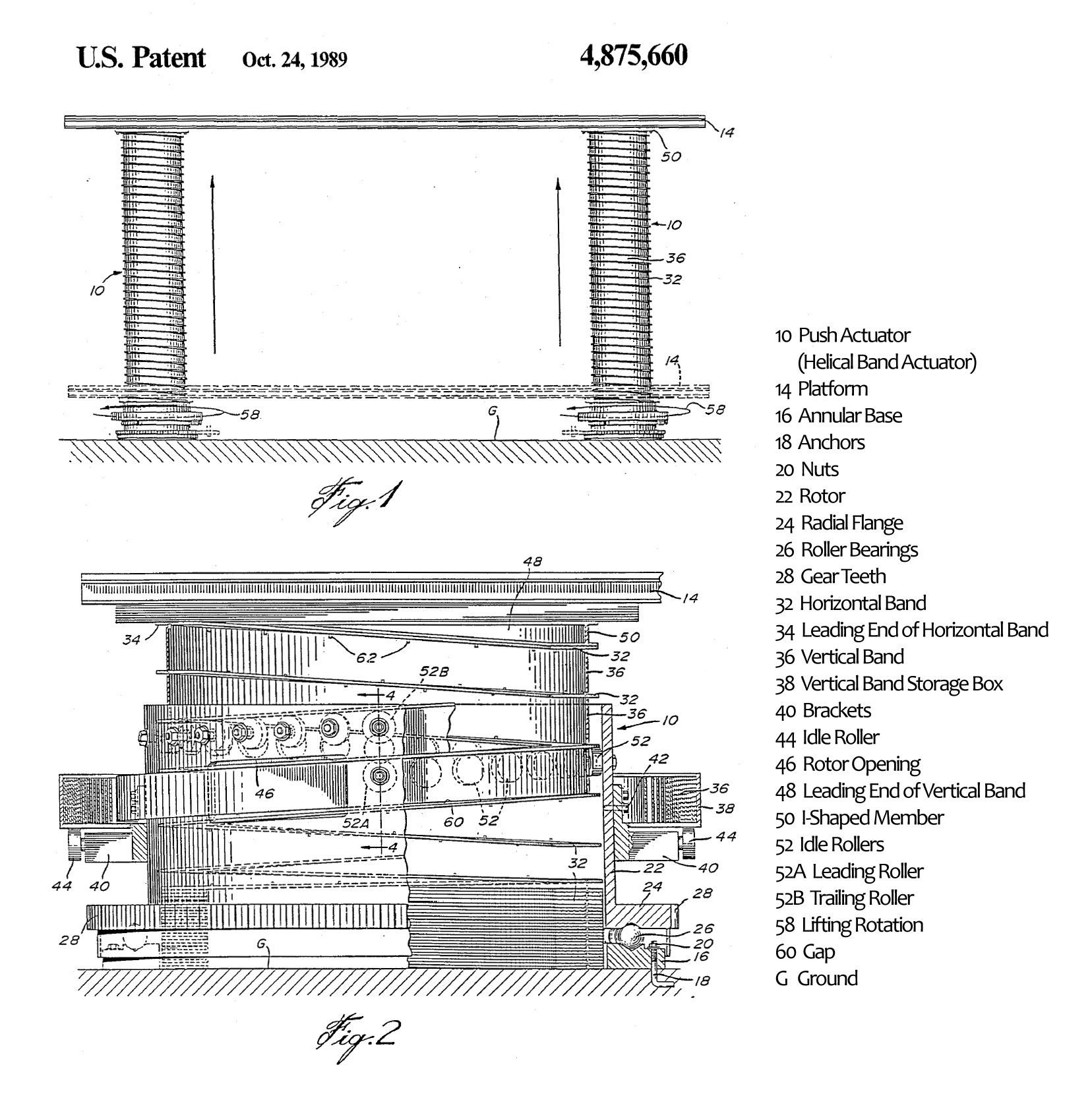
Patent Drawing for Spiralift Actuator(1989), with legend.

A helical band actuator, generally known by the trademark Spiralift, is a complex and specialized linear actuator used in stage lifts and material handling lifts. The actuator forms a high-capacity telescoping tubular column (lifting capacities to 25,000 pounds, travel to 40 feet).

== Raison d'être ==
Pierre Gagnon was awarded a US patent for the “Push Actuator” in 1989. Gagnon developed the actuator to substitute hydraulic cylinders in stage and orchestra lift systems. Hydraulic jacks were the predominant push actuators used in performing arts facilities, but they had their issues.

The piston rods of a hydraulic lift extend below the platform they support by more than the length that the lift travels. For lifts at grade, housings for the rods are often sunk into support holes, known as caissons, that are inaccessible and often complicated by groundwater levels. If placed above ground, the space occupied by the rod housings is unusable. Gagnon's actuator eliminates caissons and reduces the volume of unusable space below the platform of the lift.

Another significant issue with hydraulic lifts is platform drift, the tendency of a platform to lower due to depressurization of the hydraulic system over time. Helical band actuators do not suffer from platform drift because they are rigid mechanical devices.

Traveling nut screw jacks and rigid chain actuators can also be effective at addressing these issues with hydraulic jacks, and are also used for stage lifts.

== Principle of operation ==
The telescoping column is formed by a pair of interlocking stainless steel bands. One band has a vertical rectangular profile and the other horizontal, much like an oversized Slinky. The vertical band spirals up on itself into a stacked helix, forming the wall of the column, while at the same time, the horizontal band interlocks the continuous spiral seam of the vertical band. When the column lowers, the bands separate and retract into two compact coils. The bands are combined, separated and stored by an assembly located at the base of the column. The result is an efficient (50%-80%) telescoping lifting column.

To incorporate the device into a lift system, multiple helical band actuators are arranged below the lift platform where they are powered by an electric motor(s) and synchronized transmission. Helical band actuators require a separate lateral support mechanism, usually provided in the form of guide rails or self-guiding frame, such as a pantograph (e.g. a scissor lift).

== See also ==
- Linear actuator – Actuator that creates motion in a straight line
- Segmented spindle – spindle consisting of discrete elements that can be assembled and disassembled on the fly
- Stage lifts – Vertical transport
- Helixturm – German computer scientist and engineer (1910–1995) (by Konrad Zuse)
