= Matthew Campbell-Hill =

Scottish health tech consultant

Matthew Campbell-Hill is a health tech consultant and former GB wheelchair fencing athlete, winning bronze medals at the Wheelchair Fencing World Cup in 2014 and World Championships in 2019. He was Chair of the Challenge Group for the UK government's Anti-Doping Tailored Review published in 2018 and a case study for the Lord Holmes Review published in 2019.

== Biography ==
Campbell-Hill was born in Scotland in 1979 and grew up in Oxfordshire.

He was a member of The National Youth Choir of Great Britain (Bass 1) when The Armed Man: A Mass for Peace was premiered at The Royal Albert Hall, London, on 25 April 2000. The first official recording was released on CD during the Summer of 2000 with the National Youth Choir of Great Britain performing with The London Philharmonic Orchestra, conducted by Karl Jenkins. He recently performed with The National Youth Choir of Great Britain Alumni on Shenandoah, a mass virtual recording released in August 2020.

=== Wheelchair fencing ===
Following a spinal injury, Campbell-Hill joined Truro Fencing Club in 2009 and competed in Wheelchair Fencing for Great Britain. He competed in the men's épée (2014–2015) and men's sabre (2013–2015) teams, achieving bronze with the sabre team at a World Cup in Malchow, Germany, 2014. Due to a serious shoulder injury sustained during the Rio Paralympics qualifiers, he took a break in 2015, returning in 2018 for the Tokyo Paralympic qualifiers. In 2019 he was reserve for the men's épée team that won bronze at the World Championships in South Korea. He retired from Wheelchair Fencing in 2020, following the postponement of the Tokyo Paralympics due to the coronavirus pandemic.

=== UK Government and reviews ===
Holding a non-executive director position at the Department for Digital, Culture, Media and Sport, Campbell-Hill chaired The Challenge Panel on the "Tailored Review of UK Anti-Doping". The aim was to review UKad's function and performance, its efficiency and effectiveness. On publication in 2018, UKad received an increase in its annual budget, spread over two years.

Campbell-Hill was one of nine case studies for the Lord Holmes Review, commissioned by the UK government and published in 2018. The independent report aimed to uncover the barriers and bias blocking disabled talent from public appointments. The government accepted the principle of all Lord Holmes' recommendations, and in 2019 published a refreshed Public Appointments Diversity Action Plan.

In February 2023, Campbell-Hill was appointed chair of the Disabled Persons Transport Advisory Committee.

Campbell-Hill is currently a Non-Executive Director and Audit and Risk Advisory Committee member for the Driver Vehicle Standards Agency (DVSA) and Non-Executive Director leading on global communications and strategy for Magway.

=== Digital health technology ===
In 2009, Campbell-Hill joined the newly formed Medical Technologies Advisory Committee (MTAC), a National Institute for Healthcare and Excellence (NICE) committee who advise on the uptake and best practice for new medical technologies across the NHS. In 2016 he was appointed as a senior advisor to the NHS WiFi Programme board, a programme that has, to date, wi-fi enabled over 8000 centres of patient care across England. In 2018, following the end of his appointment as a Non-Executive Director for the Medicines and Healthcare Products Regulatory Agency (MHRA), the UK's regulator of medicines, medical devices and blood donations for transfusions, he became Senior Fellow in Novel Technologies at the College of Medical and Dental Sciences, University of Birmingham.

During the outbreak of coronavirus in the United Kingdom in 2020, he co-designed a miniature isolation tent, the Aerosolshield, that forms a physical barrier between the patient and carers. It has been named by Raconteur in the "Future of Healthcare" report published in The Times in August 2020 as "One of the ten innovations in the fight against COVID-19".

In 2020, Mat was a nominee in the Science category for The Shaw Trust Disability Power 100, an annual list that celebrates Britain's most influential disabled people and organisations.
