= Air cylinder =

Air cylinder may refer to:

- A gas cylinder used to store compressed air
- Pneumatic cylinder, a mechanical device used to impart a force from a fluid, such as air
