= Rotary stage =

Component in motion systems

A rotary stage is a component of a motion system used to restrict an object to a single axis of rotation. The terms rotary table or rotation stage are often used interchangeably with rotary stage. All rotary stages consist of a platform and a base, joined by some form of guide in such a way that the platform is restricted to rotation about a single axis with respect to the base. In common usage, the term rotary stage may or may not also include the mechanism by which the angular position of the platform is controlled relative to the base.

== Principle of operation ==
In three-dimensional space, an object may either rotate about, or translate along, any of three axes. Thus, the object is said to have six degrees of freedom (3 rotational and 3 translational). A rotary stage exhibits only one degree of freedom (rotation about one axis). In other words, rotary stages operate by physically restricting 3 axes of translation and 2 axes of rotation.

== Bearing types ==
Rotary stages consist of a platform that moves relative to a base. The platform and base are joined by some form of bearing which restricts motion of the platform to rotation about a single axis. A variety of different styles of bearings are used, each with benefits and drawbacks, making them more appropriate for some applications than for others.

=== Plain bearing ===
A plain bearing is simply two surfaces sliding against each other. Typically, a circular step on the platform mates snugly with a circular depression in the base allowing free rotation while minimizing side to side motion. A rotary stage built with this type of bearing is usually only used for coarse positioning and is adjusted manually simply by turning the platform. Index marks on either the base or the platform are often provided, allowing for somewhat repeatable positioning of the platform relative to the base.

=== Rolling-element bearing ===
This type of rotary stage includes ball bearing stages, crossed roller bearing stages, and possibly others. Any of a number of different rolling-element bearings may be employed. Typically, a pair of bearings is used and they are preloaded to take up any slack which could result in the stage platform lifting relative to the base.

== Position control methods ==
=== Manual direct ===
Some rotary stages are operated simply by turning the platform by hand. The platform may have index marks for setting different angular positions relative to the base. A locking mechanism may be provided to fix the platform to the base at the desired position.

=== Manual worm drive ===
For more precise position control, a worm drive may be used. A worm wheel is fixed to the rotating platform and meshes with a worm in the base. Rotation of the worm via a manual control knob causes the platform to rotate with respect to the base. Index marks on both the control knob and the platform can be used to locate the platform very precisely and repeatably with respect to the base.

=== Stepper motor with worm drive ===
Replacing the manual control knob in the above manual worm drive scenario a stepper motor allows positioning of the rotary stage to be automated. A stepper motor rotates in fixed increments or steps. The number of steps moved is controlled by the stepper motor controller. In this sense, the stepper motor behaves much like an indexed control knob.

=== DC motor and encoder with worm drive ===
A DC motor may also be used in place of a manual control knob. A DC motor does not move in fixed increments. Therefore, an alternate means is required to determine stage position. An encoder may be attached to the DC motor and used to report the angular position of the motor to the motor controller, allowing a motion controller to reliably and repeatably move the stage to set positions.

=== Linear actuator ===
When precise angular positioning over only a small total angle is required, a linear actuator (either manual, or motorized) may be used. Typically, the range of motion possible is only 10° to 20° of rotation. The linear actuator presses against a contact surface fixed to the stage platform such that extension or retraction of the actuator causes the platform to rotate. The stage platform is sprung against the actuator tip so that the contact surface stays in contact with the actuator tip when the actuator retracts.

== See also ==
- Linear stage
- Plain bearing
- Rolling-element bearing
