= Sawyer motor =

A Sawyer motor or planar motor (also called area drive) is a multi-coordinate drive that can perform several independent movements in one plane. Goods can be transported along any path to any location. In the industrial environment, the planar motor replaces cross tables in machine tools, for example. This class of motors is named for Bruce Sawyer, who invented it in 1968.

== History ==
The Sawyer motor can be traced back to Bruce Sawyer. The U.S. engineer applied for a patent for a "Magnetic Positioning Device" in 1966, which was confirmed in 1968.

Xiaodong Lu and Irfan-Ur-Rab Usman developed and patented a long-stroke magnetically levitated planar motor architecture in 2012 at UBC. Planar Motor Inc. commercially launched the first product based on this technology in 2017.

== Operating principles ==
=== Sawyer Motor ===
The forcer (mover) contains two sets of windings oriented 90° to each other, which interact with a magnetically permeable toothed platen below to produce X and Y thrust via a stepping or servo principle, levitated a few micrometers above the platen surface by a pressurized air bearing.

=== Magnetically Levitated Planar Motor (MLPM) ===
Magnetically levitated planar motors generate force through the Lorentz interaction between actively controlled currents in the stationary coil array and the permanent-magnet field of the mover. The mover is typically composed of Halbach arrays and does not include active components. The position of the mover is actively controlled by adjusting the currents in the coils of the ironless stator based on position feedback gathered by magnetic sensors in the stator.

== Application area ==
Sawyer motors are commonly used in semiconductor and electronics processing and inspection machinery while magnetically levitated planar motors are mainly used for handling products in individual machines or in machine lines. They combine the dynamics of conventional linear transport systems with magnetic levitation technology, which enables individual and decoupled product transport. In addition, they enable improved product traceability.

Since there is no mechanical connection between the stator and the mover, planar motors are characterized by minimal maintenance and cleaning requirements. The cover of the base surface can also be made of stainless steel, glass, or plastic, for example, to protect it from leakage of liquids or cleaning processes.

== See also ==
- Linear motor
- Tubular linear motor
