= TELMAG =

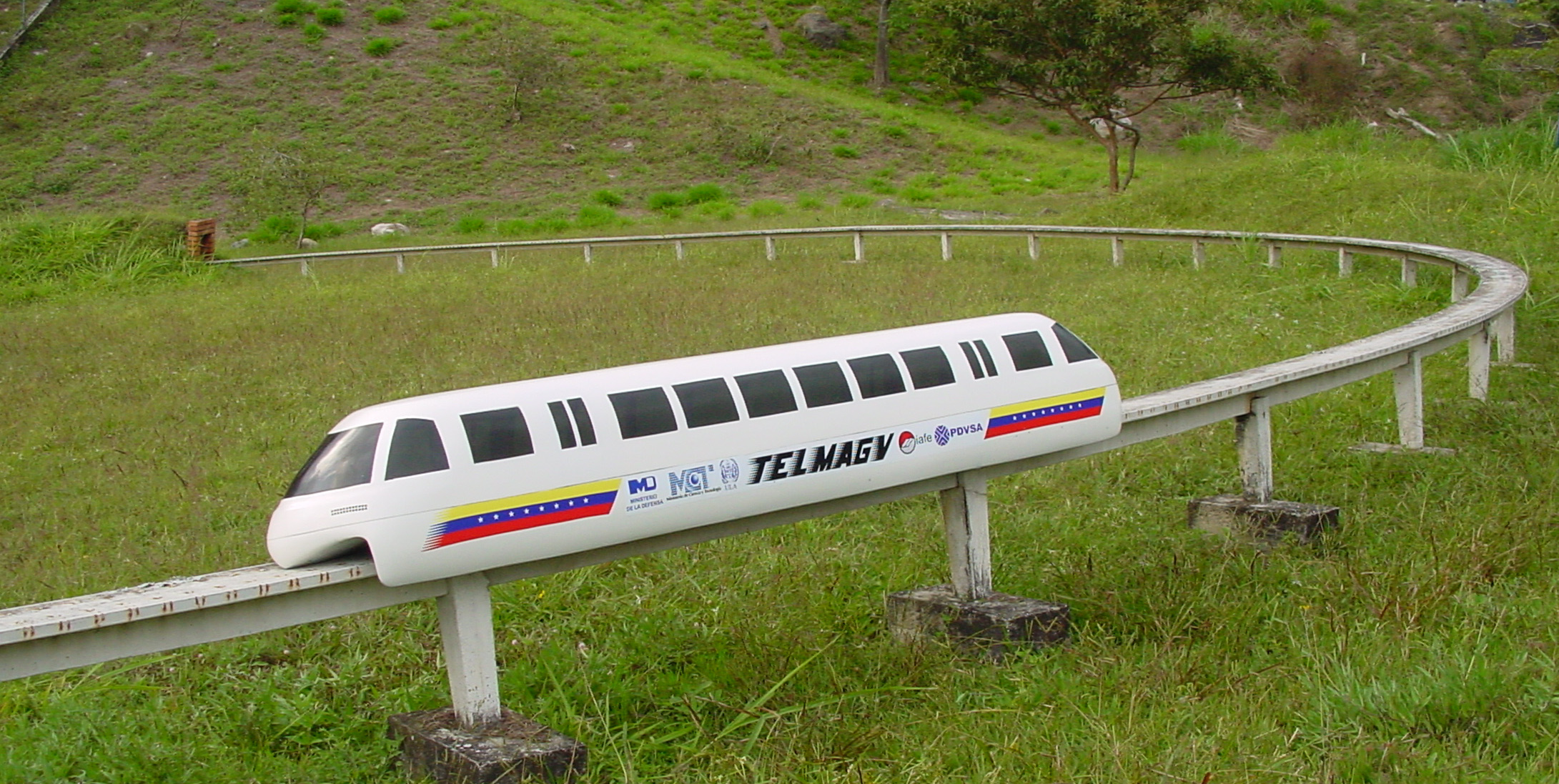
Electromagnetic Train prototype

TELMAG (Tren Electromagnético - Spanish for 'Electromagnetic Train') is an ongoing research project which was born in the Instituto Venezolano de Investigaciones Científicas (IVIC) in 1967, and was later continued by the Universidad de Los Andes, Venezuela. The TELMAG is a ground mass transport system that does not require mechanical friction for drive and guidance as conventional trains do.

== Overview ==
The main idea of this system is to use a linear reluctance motor for drive, guidance and suspension. This motor uses the same forces that drive rotative motors, but without a mechanical transmission to apply the torque to the vehicle wheels. Instead, these forces are applied between the vehicle and the rail, reducing mechanical friction and wear. Also, the TELMAGV can climb steeper gradients than a conventional system because it does not depend on friction between wheel and rail for propulsion.

== Project background ==
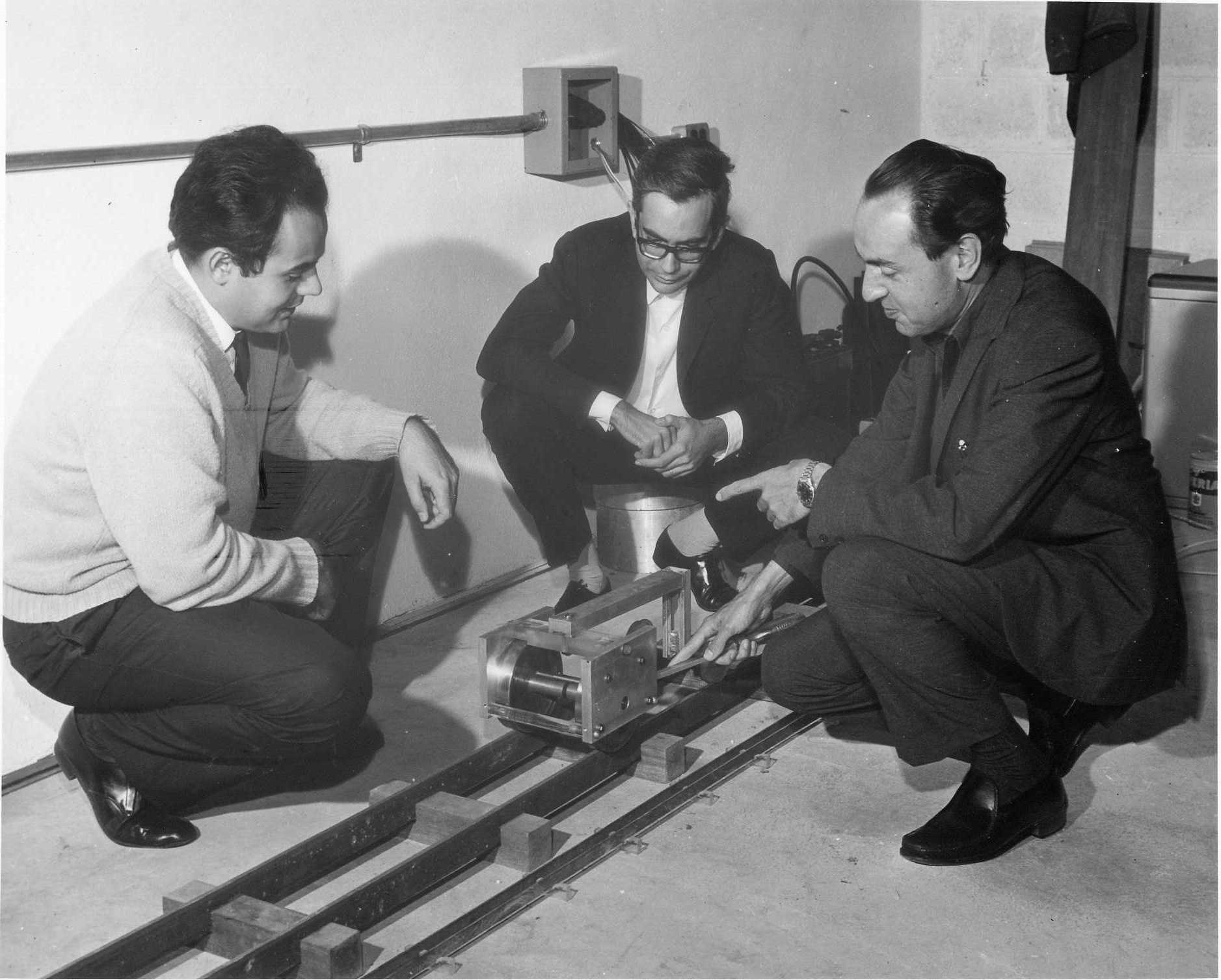
Máximo García Sucre, Alberto Serra Valls, Carlos Gago Bousquet

In 1967, three IVIC investigators, inspired by Venezuela's complicated topography, initiated a research project about a more efficient traction system that could work on steeply-graded routes. An example is the Caracas – La Guaira route that, in only 10 kilometres, climbs 800 metres. This route is critical because Venezuela's most important airport and port are located in La Guaira.

=== List of TELMAG 1:10 scale prototypes ===
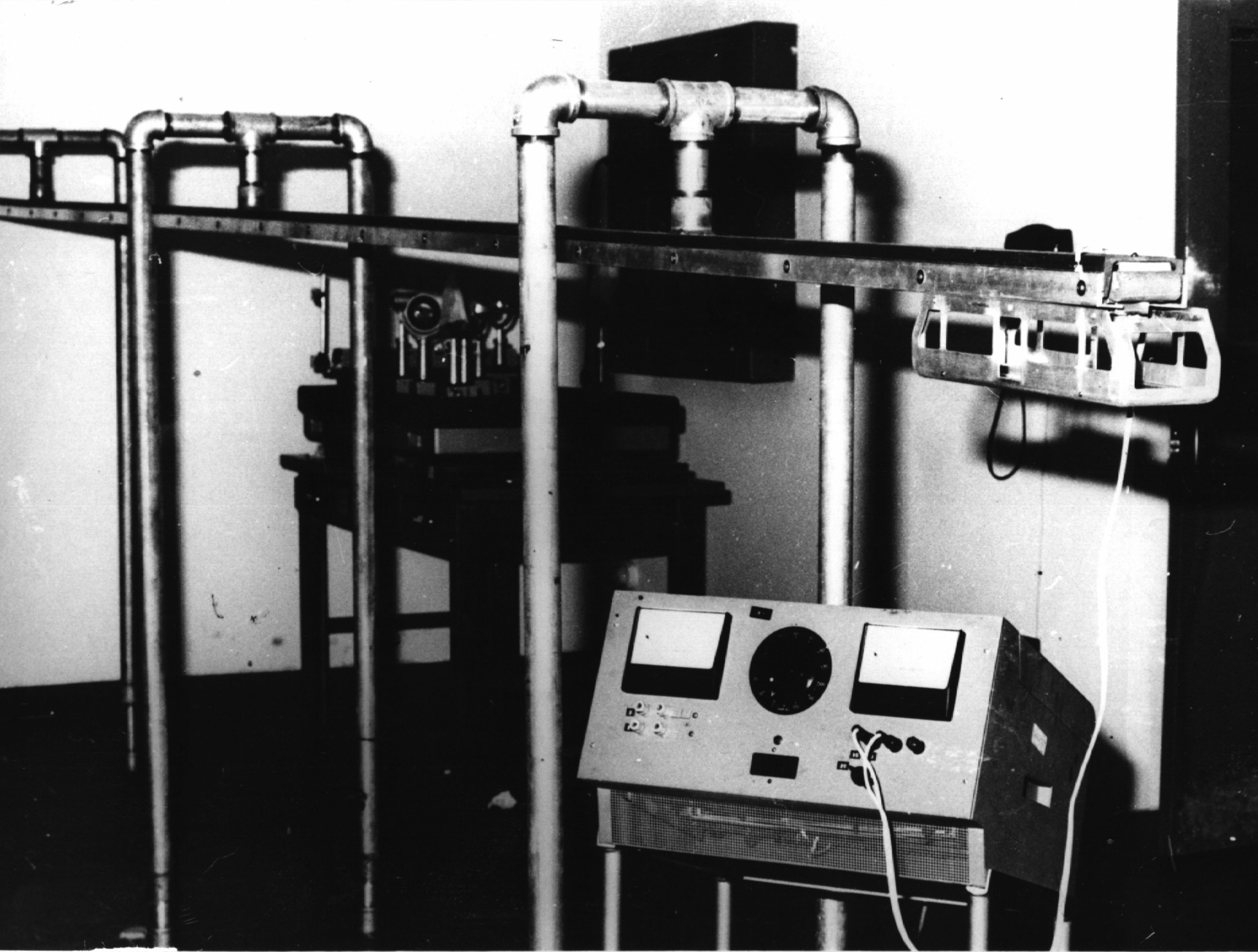
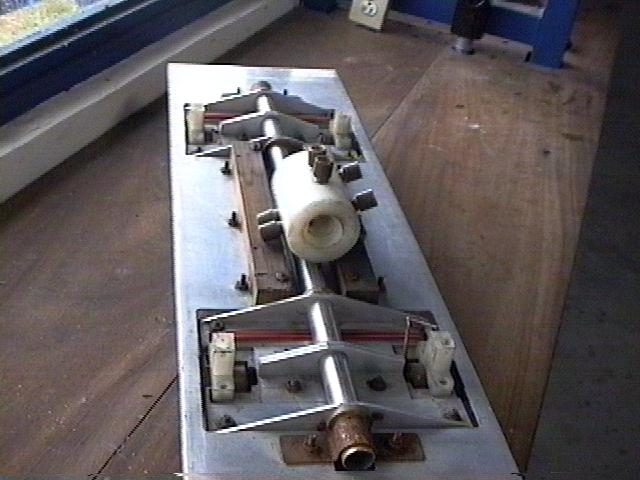
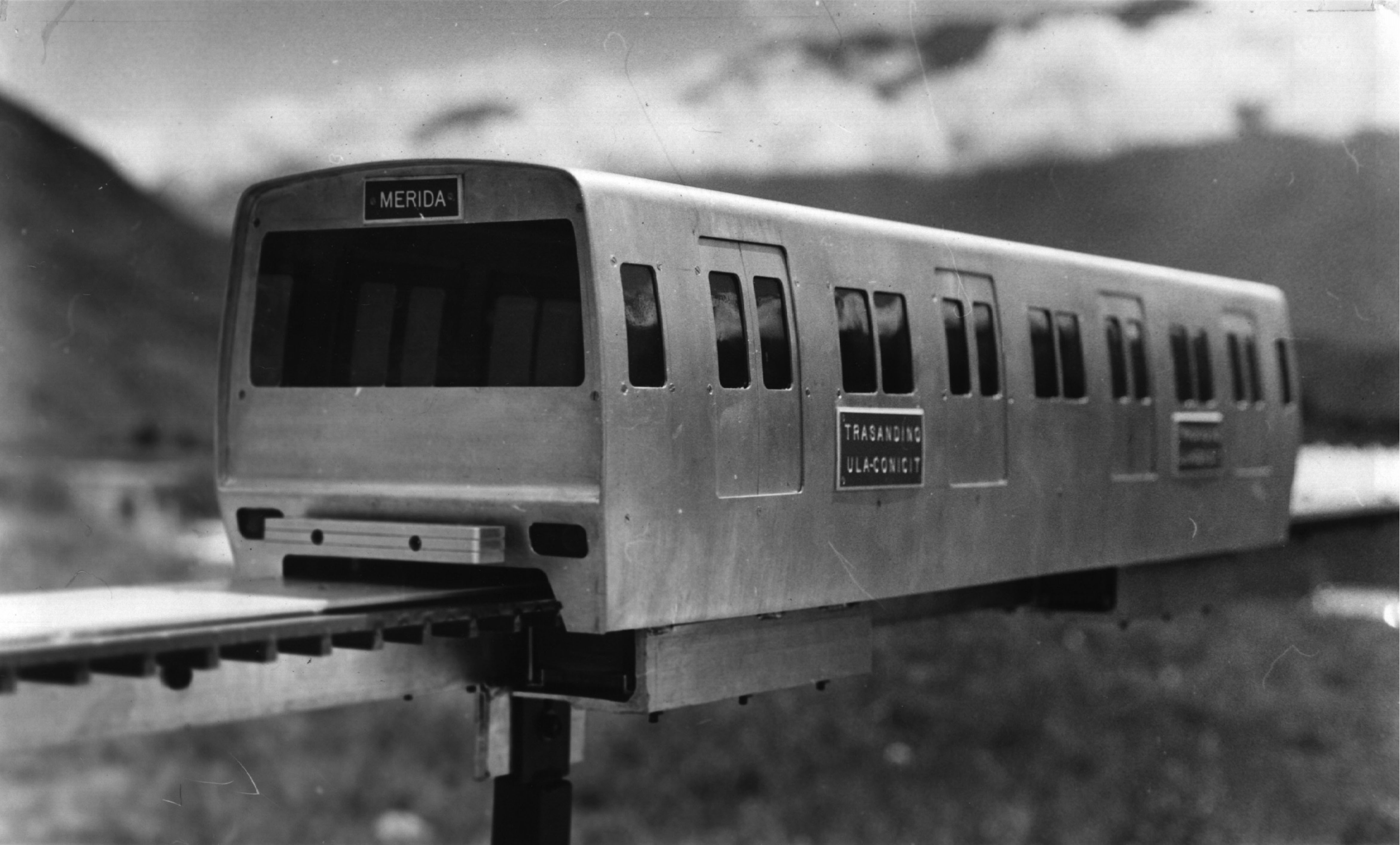
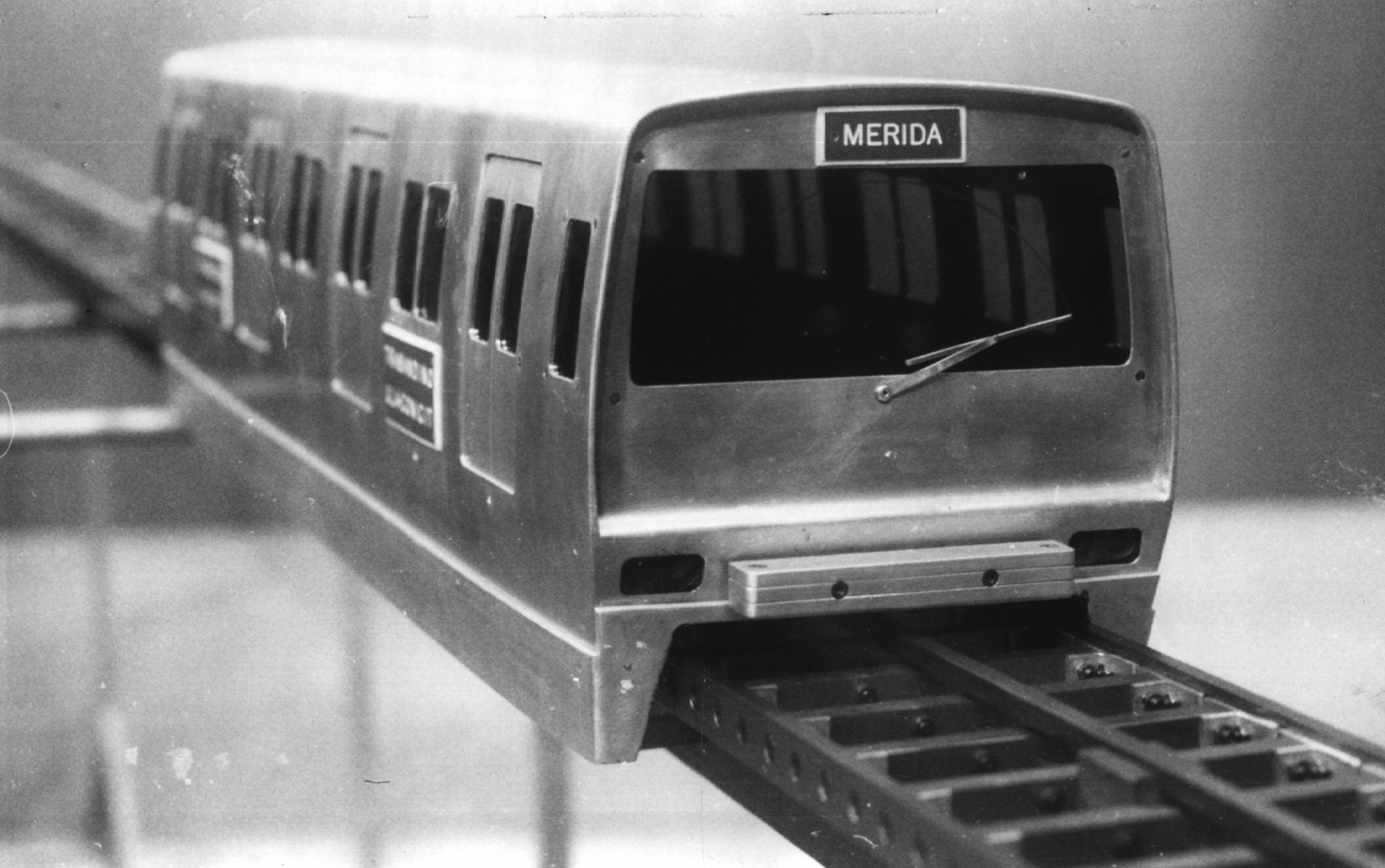
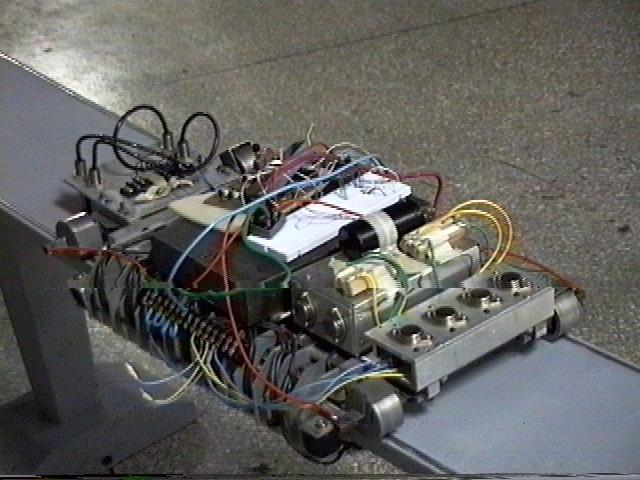
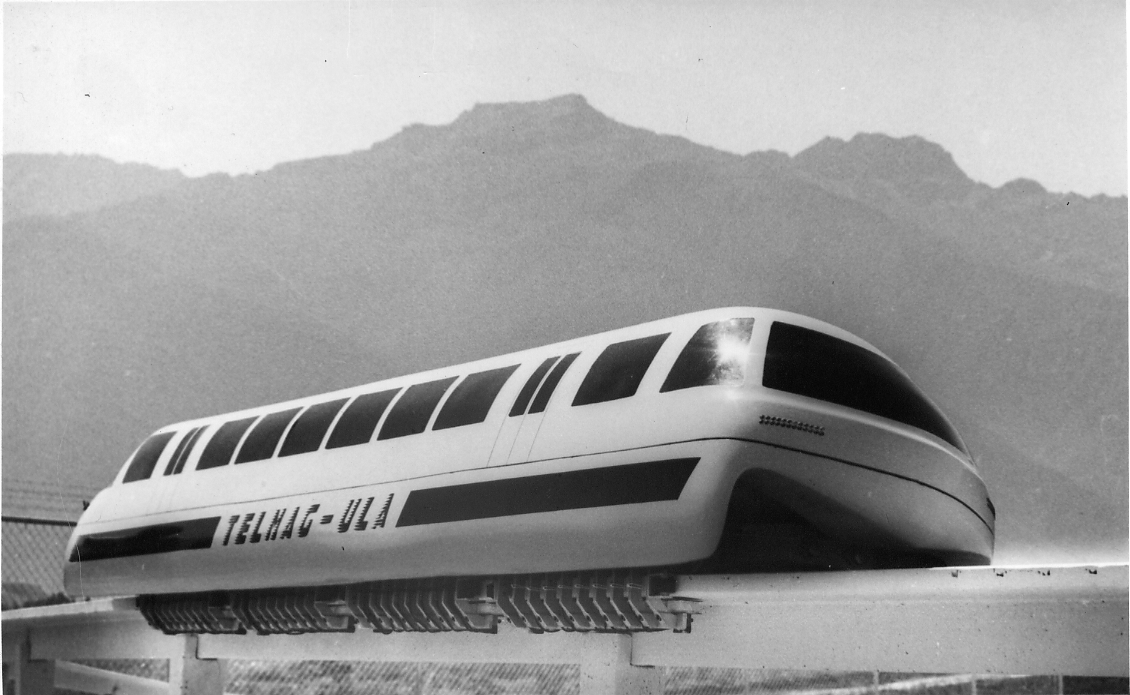
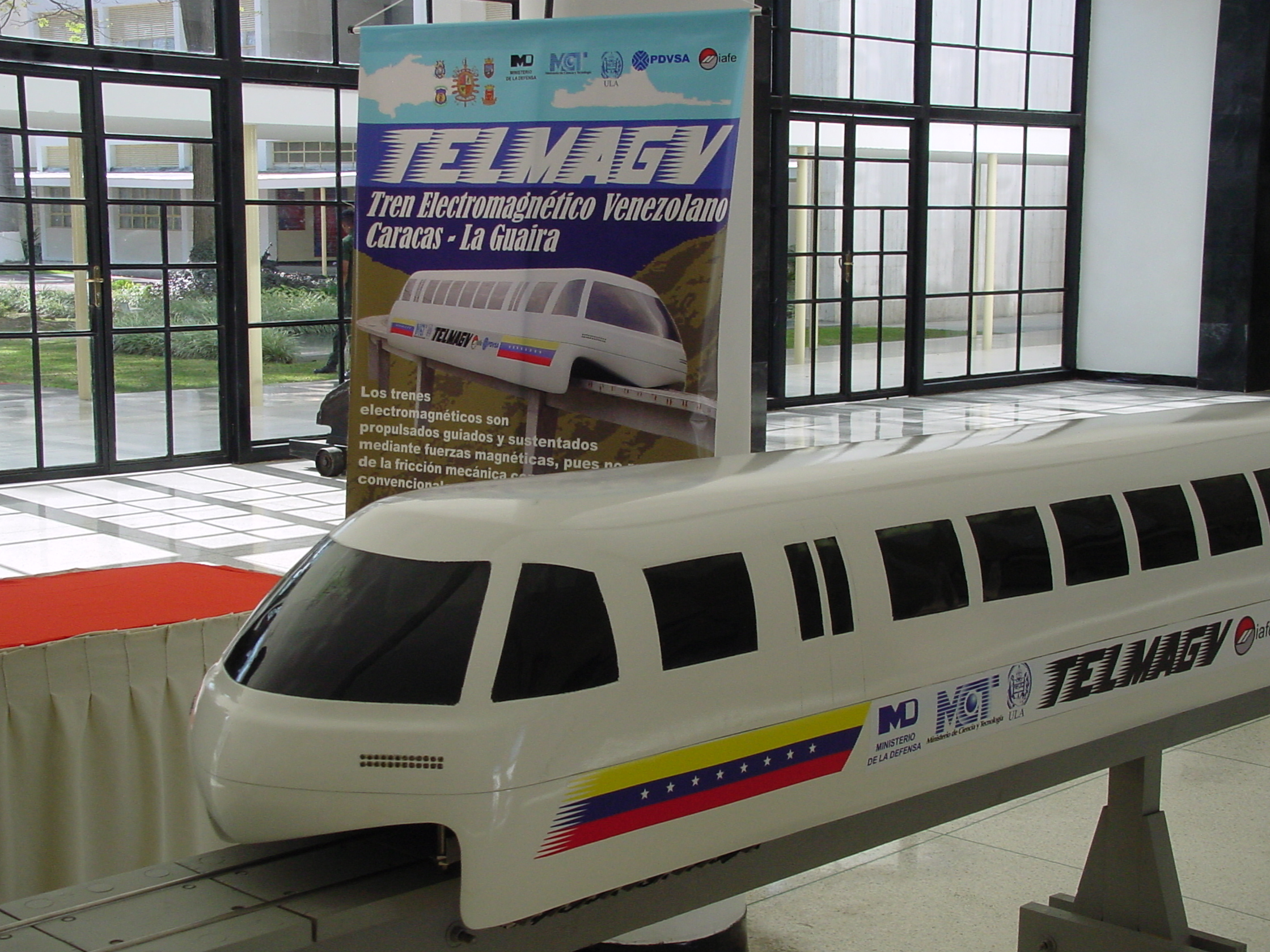
Prototype 1 (1971)
This was the first version developed in the IVIC. It consisted of a rotative reluctance motor that interacted with a lineal ferromagnetic band.
Prototype 2 (1976–1980)
First prototype developed in the Universidad de los Andes. The rotative motor was replaced by a linear motor.
Prototype 3 (1981–1984)
In this prototype improvements were made mainly in the control system.
Prototype 4 (1985–1987)
This prototype was presented at several expositions, INOVA 86, CADAFE (1987) and to the former Venezuelan President Jaime Lusinchi and his ministers in June 1987. The more important features of this prototype were: a better design, stiffer and lighter chassis and a more sophisticated electronic controller.
Prototype 5 (1988–1991)
This prototype was the result of three decades of research. It was designed and built in the Universidad de los Andes with contributions from Professors of the Faculty of Engineering. In addition to the further development of the control system (using microprocessors) and the vehicle's chassis, a great improvement of the rail also was made.
Prototype 6 (1992–2005)
Great improvements were made in the linear motor's control logic and a big circular test track of 86 metres perimeter was constructed. This allowed for greater speed tests.
Prototype 7 (2006–2007)
In the beginning of 2006, at the Comandancia General del Ejército (General Command of the Army) and later the Ministry of Defence (Venezuela), directed by the General Raúl Isaías Baduel, decided to support this project and make a proposal to the Venezuelan Government for the construction of the Caracas – La Guaira route. Improvements were made to the vehicles and the rails and the control system were totally redesigned. Also two new body types, a flat wagon and a tank wagon, were made to illustrate that this system could also be used for freight transport. A presentation was made to the Venezuelan President Hugo Chávez on 28 December 2006, and to the National Assembly (Venezuela) on 25 April 2007.

== Safety ==
The electromagnetic trains are a safe mass transport system. Additionally electromagnetic systems (like the TELMAG) have a motor's design, that make impossible its derailment, making them even safer than conventional systems.

== Environmental benefits ==
For many years, trains have been the most environmentally friendly transport system. Furthermore, promotes economic growth because the investment in this kind of transport stimulates the development of new technologies. For these reasons, and to reduce traffic jams and pollution, research on cleaner, safer, faster and more efficient transport systems must be done.

The electromagnetic train is one of the most environmentally friendly systems because it is a completely electrical system and does not create direct pollution. Also, the elevated monorail system and hill climbing capabilities guarantee a minimal environmental impact. This makes the system compatible with the fragile and rich ecosystems because this kind of track requires less earthmoving than conventional systems. Likewise, generated electromagnetic fields meets international standards.

== The future ==
It is likely that future railways, built on plains or in mountainous regions, will be elevated because this way the track is less vulnerable to floods and landslides produced by violent weather. The fate of the trains from Caracas - La Guaira, Caracas - Valencia, La Ceiba - La Fría - El Vigía, was a consequence of floods and landslides.

== Rejection ==
The project was cancelled in 2008 because of huge financial problems in Venezuela's economy.
