= Tubular linear motor =

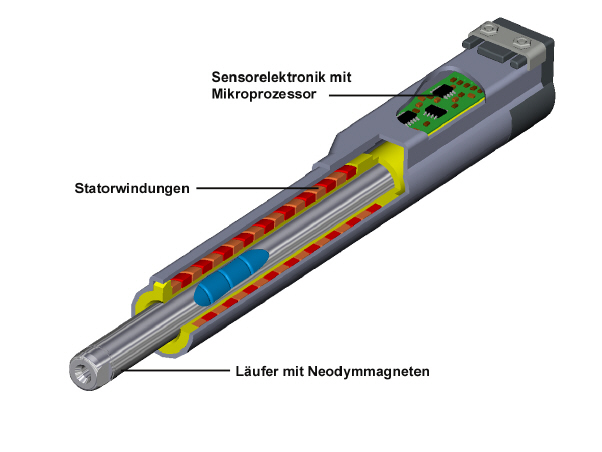
Cutaway diagram of a tubular linear motor

A tubular linear motor is a type of linear electric motor with a forcer consisting of a series of solenoids wrapped around a cylinder enclosing a movable rod that contains a number of strong cylindrical permanent magnets aligned in alternating and opposing directions. Tubular linear motors are used in applications requiring linear actuators with performance that cannot be met by other forms of linear actuators such as pneumatic cylinders or lead screw linear actuators. Either the forcer (the part containing the coils) or the rod (the part containing the magnets) may be the moving part, depending on the application.

As part of a servomechanism, tubular linear motors can achieve a simultaneous combination of high forces, high speeds, and high precision that is well beyond the capabilities of most other types of actuators.

Permanent-magnet based tubular linear motors should not be confused with tubular linear induction motors, which work on a different principle.

== See also ==
- Coilgun
- Linear motor
- Moving magnet actuator
