= Linear actuator =

Actuator that creates motion in a straight line

Conceptual design of a basic traveling-nut linear actuator. In this example the lead screw (gray) rotates while the lead nut (yellow) and tube (red) do not.

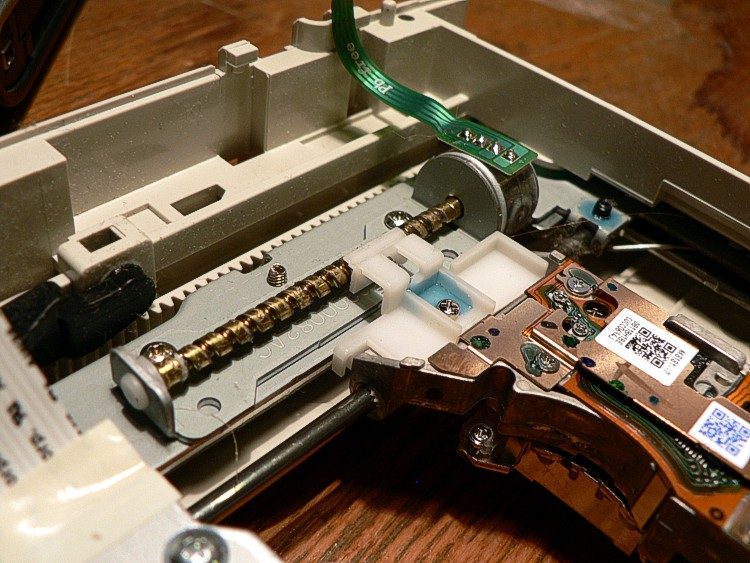
DVD drive with leadscrew and stepper motor.

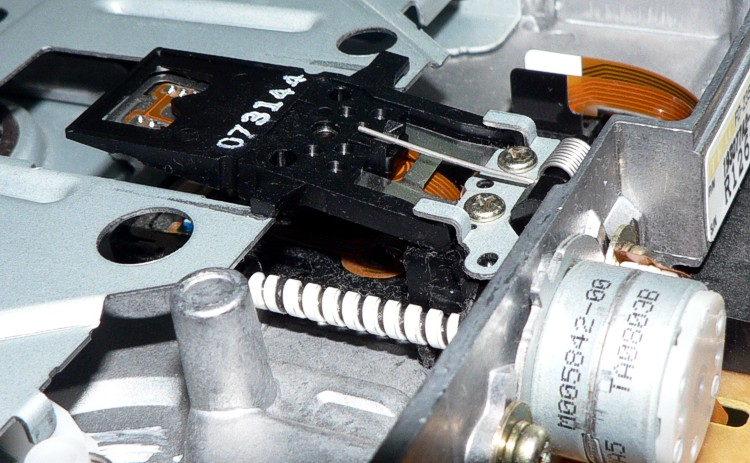
Floppy disc drive with leadscrew and stepper motor.

A linear actuator is an actuator that creates linear motion (i.e., in a straight line), in contrast to the circular motion of a conventional electric motor. Linear actuators are used in machine tools and industrial machinery, in computer peripherals such as disk drives and printers, in valves and dampers, and in many other places where linear motion is required. Hydraulic or pneumatic cylinders inherently produce linear motion.

== Types ==
=== Mechanical actuators ===
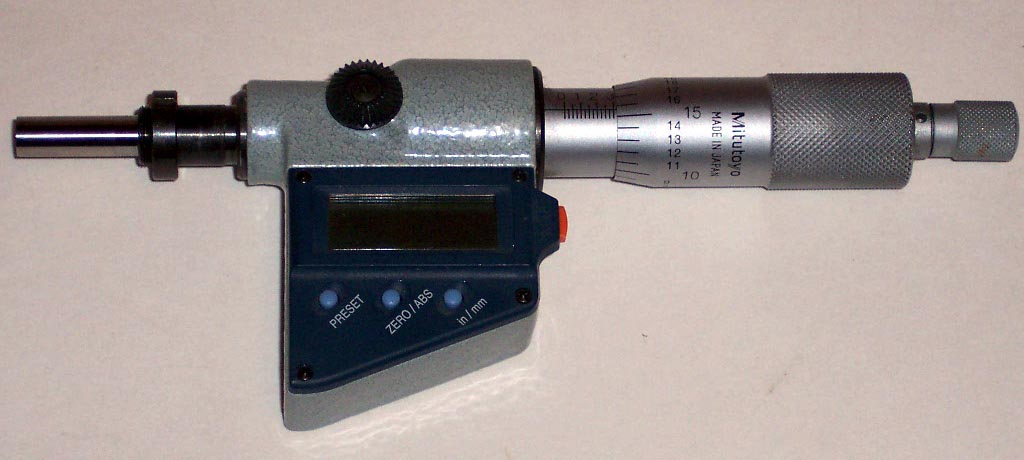
A mechanical linear actuator with digital readout (a type of micrometer).

Roller screw actuation with traveling screw (rotating nut).

Mechanical linear actuators typically operate by conversion of rotary motion into linear motion. Conversion is commonly made via a few simple types of mechanism:

- Screw: leadscrew, screw jack, ball screw and roller screw actuators all operate on the principle of the simple machine known as the screw. By rotating the actuator's nut, the screw shaft moves in a line.
- Wheel and axle: Hoist, winch, rack and pinion, chain drive, belt drive, rigid chain and rigid belt actuators operate on the principle of the wheel and axle. A rotating wheel moves a cable, rack, chain or belt to produce linear motion.
- Cam: Cam actuators function on a principle similar to that of the wedge, but provide relatively limited travel. As a wheel-like cam rotates, its eccentric shape provides thrust at the base of a shaft.

Some mechanical linear actuators only pull, such as hoists, chain drive and belt drives. Others only push (such as a cam actuator). Pneumatic and hydraulic cylinders, or lead screws can be designed to generate force in both directions.

Mechanical actuators typically convert rotary motion of a control knob or handle into linear displacement via screws and/or gears to which the knob or handle is attached. A jackscrew or car jack is a familiar mechanical actuator. Another family of actuators are based on the segmented spindle. Rotation of the jack handle is converted mechanically into the linear motion of the jack head. Mechanical actuators are also frequently used in the field of lasers and optics to manipulate the position of linear stages, rotary stages, mirror mounts, goniometers and other positioning instruments. For accurate and repeatable positioning, index marks may be used on control knobs. Some actuators include an encoder and digital position readout. These are similar to the adjustment knobs used on micrometers except their purpose is position adjustment rather than position measurement.

=== Fluid actuators ===
==== Hydraulic ====
Hydraulic actuators or hydraulic cylinders typically involve a hollow cylinder having a piston inserted in it. An unbalanced pressure applied to the piston generates a force that can move an external object. Since liquids are nearly incompressible, a hydraulic cylinder can provide controlled, precise linear displacement of the piston. The displacement is only along the axis of the piston. A familiar example of a manually operated hydraulic actuator is a hydraulic car jack. Typically though, the term "hydraulic actuator" refers to a device controlled by a hydraulic pump.

==== Pneumatic ====
Pneumatic actuators, or pneumatic cylinders, are similar to hydraulic actuators except they use compressed air to generate force instead of a liquid. They work similarly to a piston in which air is pumped inside a chamber and pushed out of the other side of the chamber. Air actuators are not necessarily used for heavy duty machinery and instances where large amounts of weight are present. One of the reasons pneumatic linear actuators are preferred to other types is the fact that the power source is simply an air compressor. Because air is the input source, pneumatic actuators are able to be used in many places of mechanical activity. The downside is, most air compressors are large, bulky, and loud. They are hard to transport to other areas once installed. Pneumatic linear actuators are likely to leak and this makes them less efficient than mechanical linear actuators.

=== Piezoelectric actuators ===
The piezoelectric effect is a property of certain materials in which application of a voltage to the material causes it to expand. Very high voltages correspond to only tiny expansions. As a result, piezoelectric actuators can achieve extremely fine positioning resolution, but also have a very short range of motion. In addition, piezoelectric materials exhibit hysteresis which makes it difficult to control their expansion in a repeatable manner.

=== Electromechanical actuators ===
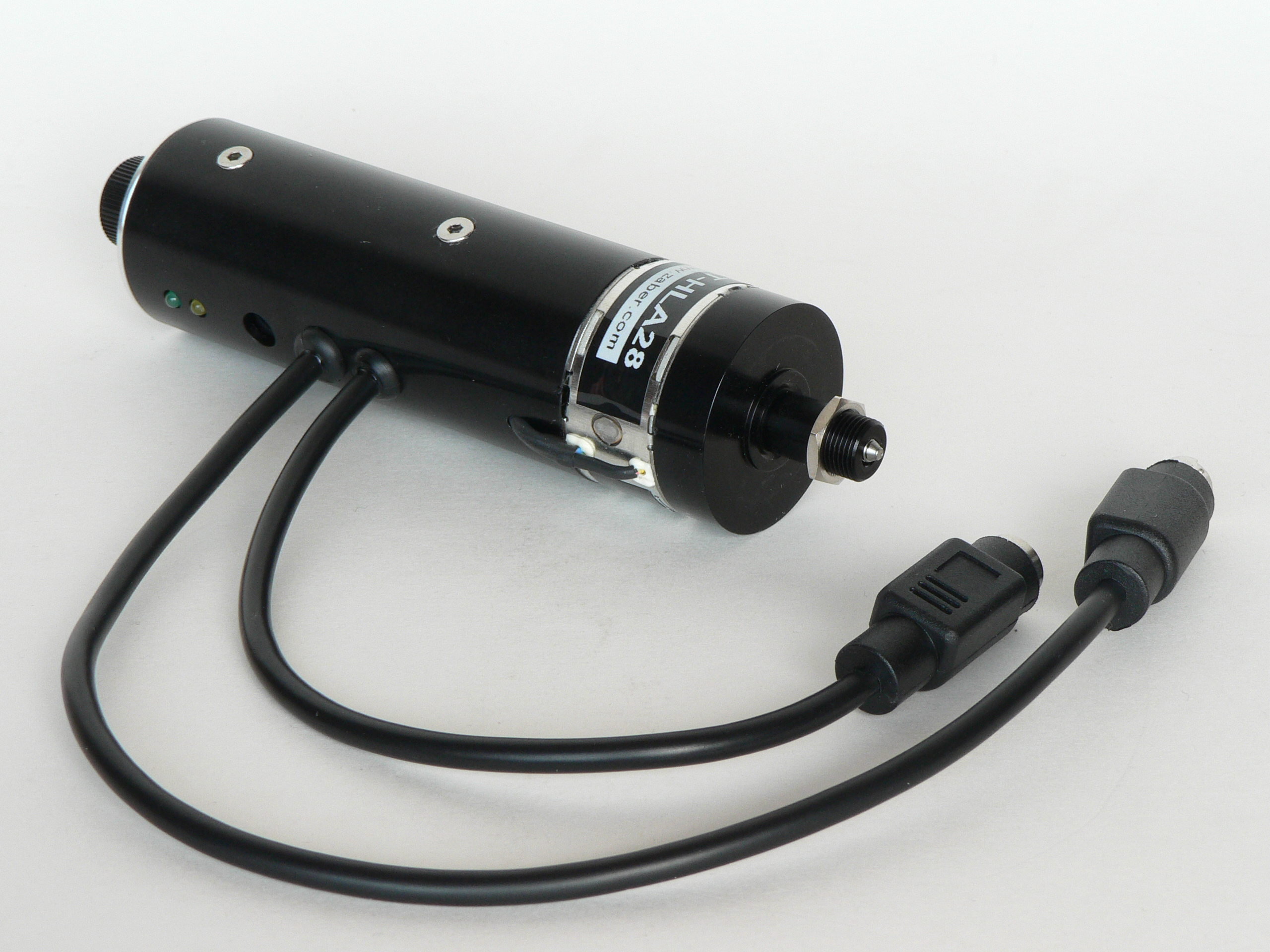
A miniature electromechanical linear actuator where the lead nut is part of the motor. The lead screw does not rotate, so as the lead nut is rotated by the motor, the lead screw is extended or retracted.

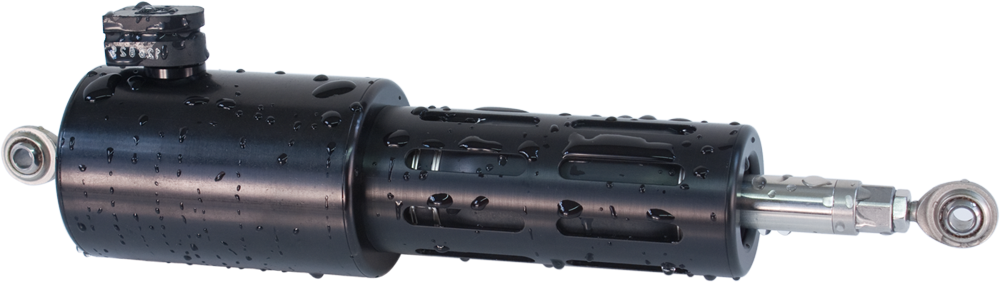
Pressure-compensated underwater linear actuator, used on a Remotely Operated Underwater Vehicle (ROV)

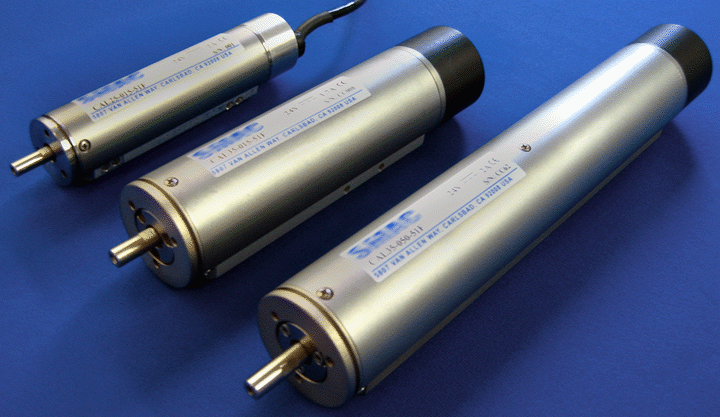
Typical compact cylindrical linear electric actuator

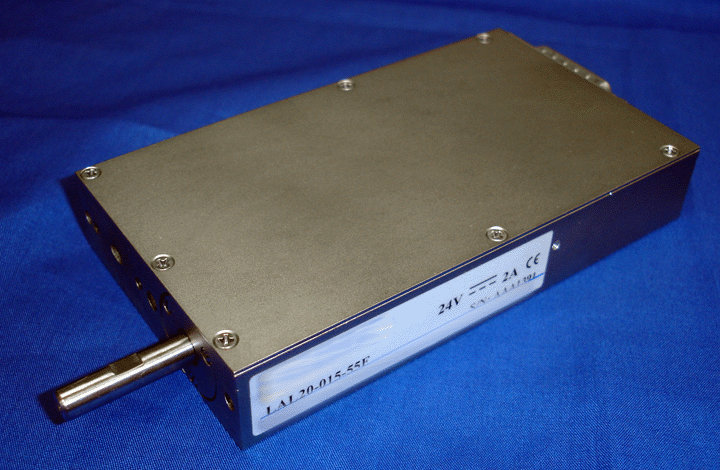
Typical linear or rotary + linear electric actuator

Moving coil linear, rotary and linear + rotary actuators at work in various applications

Electro-mechanical actuators are similar to mechanical actuators except that the control knob or handle is replaced with an electric motor. Rotary motion of the motor is converted to linear displacement. Electromechanical actuators may also be used to power a motor that converts electrical energy into mechanical torque. There are many designs of modern linear actuators and every company that manufactures them tends to have a proprietary method. The following is a generalized description of a very simple electro-mechanical linear actuator.

==== Simplified design ====
Typically, an electric motor is mechanically connected to rotate a lead screw. A lead screw has a continuous helical thread machined on its circumference running along the length (similar to the thread on a bolt). Threaded onto the lead screw is a lead nut or ball nut with corresponding helical threads. The nut is prevented from rotating with the lead screw (typically the nut interlocks with a non-rotating part of the actuator body). When the lead screw is rotated, the nut will be driven along the threads. The direction of motion of the nut depends on the direction of rotation of the lead screw. By connecting linkages to the nut, the motion can be converted to usable linear displacement. Most current actuators are built for high speed, high force, or a compromise between the two. When considering an actuator for a particular application, the most important specifications are typically travel, speed, force, accuracy, and lifetime. Most varieties are mounted on dampers or butterfly valves.

There are many types of motors that can be used in a linear actuator system. These include dc brush, dc brushless, stepper, or in some cases, induction motors. It all depends on the application requirements and the loads the actuator is designed to move. For example, a linear actuator using an integral horsepower AC induction motor driving a lead screw can be used to operate a large valve in a refinery. In this case, accuracy and high movement resolution aren't needed, but high force and speed are. For electromechanical linear actuators used in laboratory instrumentation robotics, optical and laser equipment, or X-Y tables, fine resolution in the micron range and high accuracy may require the use of a fractional horsepower stepper motor linear actuator with a fine pitch lead screw. There are many variations in the electromechanical linear actuator system. It is critical to understand the design requirements and application constraints to know which one would be best.

==== Standard vs compact construction ====
A linear actuator using standard motors will commonly have the motor as a separate cylinder attached to the side of the actuator, either parallel with the actuator or perpendicular to the actuator. The motor may be attached to the end of the actuator. The drive motor is of typical construction with a solid drive shaft that is geared to the drive nut or drive screw of the actuator.

Compact linear actuators use specially designed motors that try to fit the motor and actuator into the smallest possible shape.

- The inner diameter of the motor shaft can be enlarged, so that the drive shaft can be hollow. The drive screw and nut can therefore occupy the center of the motor, with no need for additional gearing between the motor and the drive screw.
- Similarly the motor can be made to have a very small outside diameter, but instead the pole faces are stretched lengthwise so the motor can still have very high torque while fitting in a small diameter space.

==== Principles ====
In the majority of linear actuator designs, the basic principle of operation is that of an inclined plane. The threads of a lead screw act as a continuous ramp that allows a small rotational force to be used over a long distance to accomplish the movement of a large load over a short distance. The power supply is from a DC or AC motor. The typical motor is a 12 V DC, but other voltages are available. Actuators have a switch to reverse the polarity of the motor, which makes the actuator change its motion.

The speed and force of an actuator depend on its gearbox. The amount of force depends on the actuator’s speed. Lower speeds supply greater force because motor speed and force are constant.

One of the basic differences between actuators is their stroke, which is defined by the length of the screw and shaft. Speed depends on the gears that connect the motor to the screw.

The mechanism to stop the stroke of an actuator is a limit or micro switch, which can be seen in the image below. Microswitches are located at the top and bottom of the shaft and are triggered by the up and down movement of the screw.

==== Variations ====
Many variations on the basic design have been created. Most focus on providing general improvements such as a higher mechanical efficiency, speed, or load capacity. There is also a large engineering movement towards actuator miniaturization.

Most electro-mechanical designs incorporate a lead screw and lead nut. Some use a ball screw and ball nut. In either case the screw may be connected to a motor or manual control knob either directly or through a series of gears. Gears are typically used to allow a smaller (and weaker) motor spinning at a higher rpm to be geared down to provide the torque necessary to spin the screw under a heavier load than the motor would otherwise be capable of driving directly. Effectively this sacrifices actuator speed in favor of increased actuator thrust. In some applications the use of worm gear is common as this allows a smaller built-in dimension still allowing great travel length.

A traveling-nut linear actuator has a motor that stays attached to one end of the lead screw (perhaps indirectly through a gear box), the motor spins the lead screw, and the lead nut is restrained from spinning so it travels up and down the lead screw.

A traveling-screw linear actuator has a lead screw that passes entirely through the motor. In a traveling-screw linear actuator, the motor "crawls" up and down a lead screw that is restrained from spinning. The only spinning parts are inside the motor, and may not be visible from the outside.

Some lead screws have multiple "starts". This means they have multiple threads alternating on the same shaft. One way of visualizing this is in comparison to the multiple color stripes on a candy cane. This allows for more adjustment between thread pitch and nut/screw thread contact area, which determines the extension speed and load carrying capacity (of the threads), respectively.

==== Static load capacity ====
Linear screw actuators can have a static loading capacity, meaning that when the motor stops the actuator essentially locks in place and can support a load that is either pulling or pushing on the actuator. This static load capacity increases mobility and speed.

The braking force of the actuator varies with the angular pitch of the screw threads and the specific design of the threads. Acme threads have a very high static load capacity, while ball screws have an extremely low load capacity and can be nearly free-floating.

Generally it is not possible to vary the static load capacity of screw actuators without additional technology. The screw thread pitch and drive nut design defines a specific load capacity that cannot be dynamically adjusted.

In some cases, high viscosity grease can be added to linear screw actuators to increase the static load. Some manufacturers use this to alter the load for specific needs.

Static load capacity can be added to a linear screw actuator using an electromagnetic brake system, which applies friction to the spinning drive nut. For example, a spring may be used to apply brake pads to the drive nut, holding it in position when power is turned off. When the actuator needs to be moved, an electromagnet counteracts the spring and releases the braking force on the drive nut.

Similarly an electromagnetic ratchet mechanism can be used with a linear screw actuator so that the drive system lifting a load will lock in position when power to the actuator is turned off. To lower the actuator, an electromagnet is used to counteract the spring force and unlock the ratchet.

==== Dynamic load capacity ====
Dynamic load capacity is typically referred to as the amount of force the linear actuator is capable of providing during operation. This force will vary with screw type (amount of friction restricting movement) and the motor driving the movement. Dynamic load is the figure which most actuators are classified by, and is a good indication of what applications it would suit best.

==== Speed control ====
In most cases when using an electro-mechanical actuator, it is preferred to have some type of speed control. Such controllers vary the voltage supplied to the motor, which in turn changes the speed at which the lead screw turns. Adjusting the gear ratio is another way to adjust speed. Some actuators are available with several different gearing options.

==== Duty cycle ====
The duty cycle of a motor refers to the amount of time the actuator can be run before it needs to cool down. Staying within this guideline when operating an actuator is key to its longevity and performance. If the duty cycle rating is exceeded, then overheating, loss of power, and eventual burning of the motor is risked.

=== Linear motors ===
A linear motor is functionally the same as a rotary electric motor with the rotor and stator circular magnetic field components laid out in a straight line. Where a rotary motor would spin around and re-use the same magnetic pole faces again, the magnetic field structures of a linear motor are physically repeated across the length of the actuator.

Since the motor moves in a linear fashion, no lead screw is needed to convert rotary motion to linear. While high capacity is possible, the material and/or motor limitations on most designs are surpassed relatively quickly due to a reliance solely on magnetic attraction and repulsion forces. Most linear motors have a low load capacity compared to other types of linear actuators. Linear motors have an advantage in outdoor or dirty environments in that the two halves do not need to contact each other, and so the electromagnetic drive coils can be waterproofed and sealed against moisture and corrosion, allowing for a very long service life. Linear motors are being used extensively in high performance positioning systems for applications which require various combinations of high velocity, high precision and high force.

=== Telescoping linear actuator ===
Rigid chain actuator

Telescoping linear actuators are specialized linear actuators used where space restrictions exist. Their range of motion is many times greater than the unextended length of the actuating member.

A common form is made of concentric tubes of approximately equal length that extend and retract like sleeves, one inside the other, such as the telescopic cylinder.

Other more specialized telescoping actuators use actuating members that act as rigid linear shafts when extended, but break that line by folding, separating into pieces and/or uncoiling when retracted. Examples of telescoping linear actuators include:

- Helical band actuator
- Rigid belt actuator
- Rigid chain actuator
- Segmented spindle

== Advantages and disadvantages ==
Actuator Type	Advantages	Disadvantages
Mechanical	Cheap. Repeatable. No power source required. Self-contained. Identical behavior extending or retracting.	Manual operation only. No automation.
Electro-mechanical	Cheap. Repeatable. Operation can be automated. Self-contained. Identical behaviour extending or retracting. DC or stepping motors. Position feedback possible.	Many moving parts prone to wear.
Linear motor	Simple design. Minimum of moving parts. High speeds possible. Self-contained. Identical behavior extending or retracting.	Low to medium force.
Piezoelectric	Very small motions possible at high speeds. Consumes barely any power.	Short travel unless amplified mechanically. High voltages required, typically 24V or more. Expensive and fragile. Good in compression only, not in tension. Typically used for Fuel Injectors.
TCP: Twisted and coiled polymer	light and inexpensive	Low efficiency and High temperature range required
Hydraulic	Very high forces possible. Relatively high power to size ratio (or power density).	Can leak. Requires position feedback for repeatability. External hydraulic pump required. Some designs good in compression only.
Pneumatic	Strong, light, simple, fast.	Precise position control impossible except at full stops
Wax motor	Smooth operation.	Not as reliable as other methods.
Segmented spindle	Very compact. Range of motion greater than length of actuator.	Both linear and rotary motion.
Moving coil	Force, position and speed are controllable and repeatable. Capable of high speeds and precise positioning. Linear, rotary, and linear + rotary actions possible.	Requires position feedback to be repeatable.
MICA: Moving iron controllable actuator	High force and controllable. Higher force and less losses than moving coils. Losses easy to dissipate. Electronic driver easy to design and set up.	Stroke limited to several millimeters, less linearity than moving coils.

== See also ==
- Helical band actuator
- Hoist – Device used for lifting or lowering a load
- Rack and pinion – Type of linear actuator
- Solenoid – Type of electromagnet formed by a coil of wire
