= Pick and place =

Pick and place is the act of picking things up from one location and placing them in another. Specific cases include:

- picking and placing is one of the major uses of industrial robots
- in the context of electronics, SMT placement equipment
- in the context of logistics, an automated storage and retrieval system
