= Linear stage =

Tool for precise linear motion

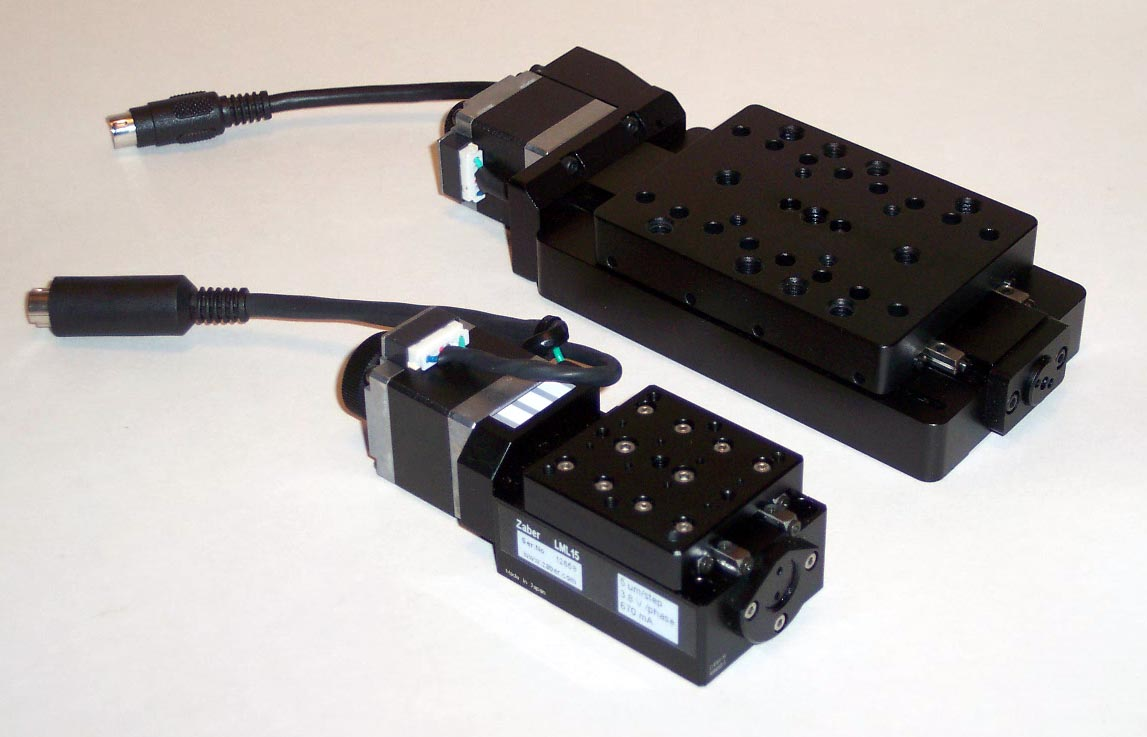
Zaber motorized linear stage.

A linear stage or translation stage is a component of a precise motion system used to restrict an object to a single axis of motion. The term linear slide is often used interchangeably with "linear stage", though technically "linear slide" refers to a linear motion bearing, which is only a component of a linear stage. All linear stages consist of a platform and a base, joined by some form of guide or linear bearing in such a way that the platform is restricted to linear motion with respect to the base. In common usage, the term linear stage may or may not also include the mechanism by which the position of the platform is controlled relative to the base.

== Principle of operation ==
In three-dimensional space, an object may either rotate about, or translate along any of three axes. Thus the object is said to have six degrees of freedom (3 rotational and 3 translational). A linear stage exhibits only one degree of freedom (translation along one axis). In other words, linear stages operate by physically restricting 3 axes of rotation and 2 axes of translation thus allowing for motion on only one translational axis.

== Guide types ==
Linear stages consist of a platform that moves relative to a base. The platform and base are joined by some form of guide which restricts motion of the platform to only one dimension. A variety of different styles of guides are used, each with benefits and drawbacks making each guide type more appropriate for some applications than for others.

=== Rollers ===
Benefits
Inexpensive.
Drawbacks
low load capacity, poor accuracy, short lifetime.
Applications
Optics lab stages, drawer slides.

=== Recirculating ball bearing ===
Benefits
Unlimited travel, relatively inexpensive.
Drawbacks
Low load capacity, quick to wear, oscillating positioning load as bearings recirculate.
Applications
CNC, 3D printing.

=== Flexure ===
Benefits
Excellent accuracy, no backlash, no wear (infinite lifetime).
Drawbacks
Short travel (limited by flexure range), low load capacity, expensive.
Applications
Optic fiber alignment.

=== Cylindrical sleeve ===
Benefits
High load capacity, unlimited travel, inexpensive.
Drawbacks
Susceptible to binding if bending moments are present.
Applications
Radial arm saws, scanners, printers.

=== Dovetail ===
Benefits
Highest load capacity, unlimited travel, long lifetime, inexpensive.
Drawbacks
High positioning force required, susceptible to binding if bending moments are present, high backlash.
Applications
Machine shop equipment (ex. mill and lathe tables).

== Position control methods ==
The position of the moving platform relative to the fixed base is typically controlled by a linear actuator of some form, whether manual, motorized, or hydraulic/pneumatic. The most common method is to incorporate a lead screw passing through a lead nut in the platform. The rotation of such a lead screw may be controlled either manually or by a motor.

=== Manual ===
In manual linear stages, a control knob attached to a lead screw is typically used. The knob may be indexed to indicate its angular position. The linear displacement of the stage is related to the angular displacement of the knob by the lead screw pitch. For example if the lead screw pitch is 0.5 mm then one full revolution of the knob will move the stage platform 0.5 mm relative to the stage base. If the knob has 50 index marks around its circumference, then each index division is equivalent to 0.01 mm of linear motion of the stage platform.

Precision stages such as those used for optics do not use a lead screw, but instead use a fine-pitch screw or a micrometer which presses on a hardened metal pad on the stage platform. Rotating the screw or micrometer pushes the platform forward. A spring provides restoring force to keep the platform in contact with the actuator. This provides more precise motion of the stage. Stages designed to be mounted vertically use a slightly different arrangement, where the actuator is attached to the movable platform and its tip rests on a metal pad on the fixed base. This allows the weight of the platform and its load to be supported by the actuator rather than the spring.

=== Stepper motor ===
In some automated stages a stepper motor may be used in place of, or in addition to a manual knob. A stepper motor moves in fixed increments called steps. In this sense it behaves very much like an indexed knob. If the lead screw pitch is 0.5 mm and the stepper motor has 200 steps per revolution (as is common), then each revolution of the motor will result in 0.5 mm of linear motion of the stage platform, and each step will result in 0.0025 mm of linear motion.

=== DC motor with encoder ===
In other automated stages a DC motor may be used in place of a manual control knob. A DC motor does not move in fixed increments. Therefore an alternate means is required to determine stage position. A scale may be attached to the internals of the stage and an encoder used to measure the position of the stage relative to the scale and report this to the motor controller, allowing a motion controller to reliably and repeatably move the stage to set positions.

== Multiple axis stage configurations ==
For position control in more than one direction, multiple linear stages may be used together. A "two-axis" or "X-Y" stage can be assembled from two linear stages, one mounted to the platform of the other such that the axis of motion of the second stage is perpendicular to that of the first. A two-axis stage with which many people are familiar is a microscope stage, used to position a slide under a lens. A "three-axis" or "X-Y-Z" stage is composed of three linear stages mounted to each other (often with the use of an additional angle bracket) such that the axes of motion of all stages are orthogonal. Some two-axis and three-axis stages are integrated designs rather than being assembled from separate single-axis stages. Some multiple-axis stages also include rotary or tilt elements such as rotary stages or positioning goniometers. By combining linear and rotary elements in various ways, four-axis, five-axis, and six-axis stages are also possible. Linear stages take an advanced form of high performance positioning systems in applications which require a combination of high speed, high precision and high force.

== Application ==
=== Semiconductor manufacturing ===
Linear stages are used in semiconductor devices fabrication process for precise linear positioning of wafers of the purposes of wafer mapping dielectric, characterization, and epitaxial layer monitoring where positioning speed and precision are critical.

== Variations ==
- Linear slide
- Nano linear stage
- Nano positioning linear stage
- Ultra precision machining linear stage
