= Rigid belt actuator =

Specialized mechanical linear actuator

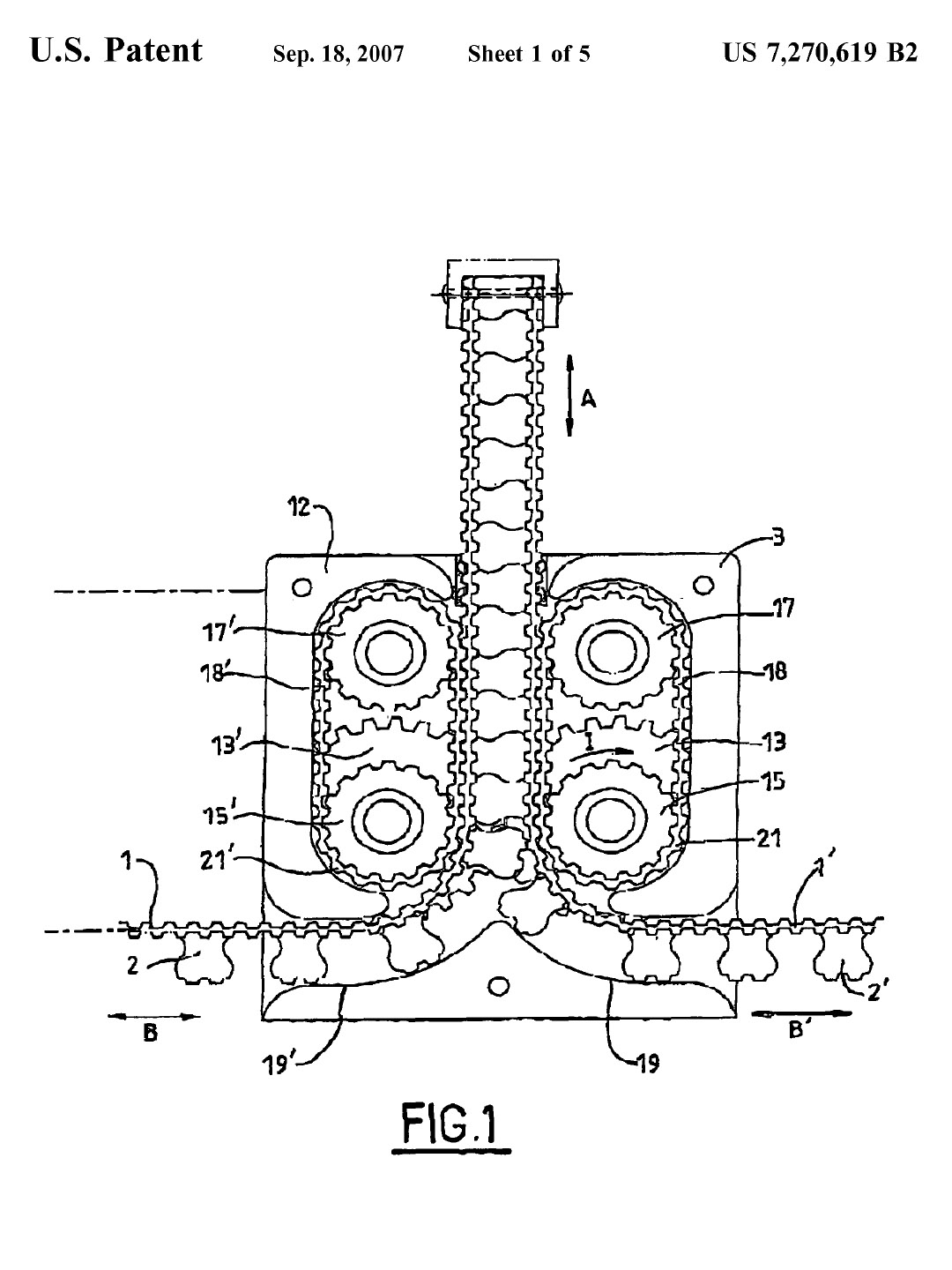
Patent Drawing for Serapid RigiBelt Rigid Belt Actuator (2007).

A rigid belt actuator, also known as a push-pull belt actuator or zipper belt actuator, is a specialized mechanical linear actuator used in push-pull and lift applications. The actuator is a belt and pinion device that forms a telescoping beam or column member to transmit traction and thrust. Rigid belt actuators can move dynamic loads up to approximately 230 pounds over about 3 feet of travel.

== Principle of operation ==
Rigid belt actuators can be thought of as rack and pinion devices that use a flexible rack. Rigid belt actuators use two reinforced plastic ribbed belts, that engage with pinions mounted on drive shafts within a housing. The belts have evenly spaced load bearing blocks on the non-ribbed face. As the pinions spin, the belts are rotated 90 degrees through the housing, which interlocks the blocks like a zipper into a rigid linear form. The resulting beam or column is effective at resisting tension and compression (buckling). Because the actuating member can fold on itself, it can be stored relatively compactly in a storage magazine, either in an overlapping or coiled arrangement. The actuator is driven by an electric motor.

== Development ==
A rigid belt actuator is effectively a non-metallic variation of the rigid chain actuator. But, while the interlocking chain actuator has been around since the middle of the 20th century, rigid belt technology didn't emerge until the new millennium. Joël Bourc'His received a patent for his “Linear Belt Actuator” in 2007.

== See also ==
- Linear actuator
- Rigid chain actuator
