= Positioning goniometer =

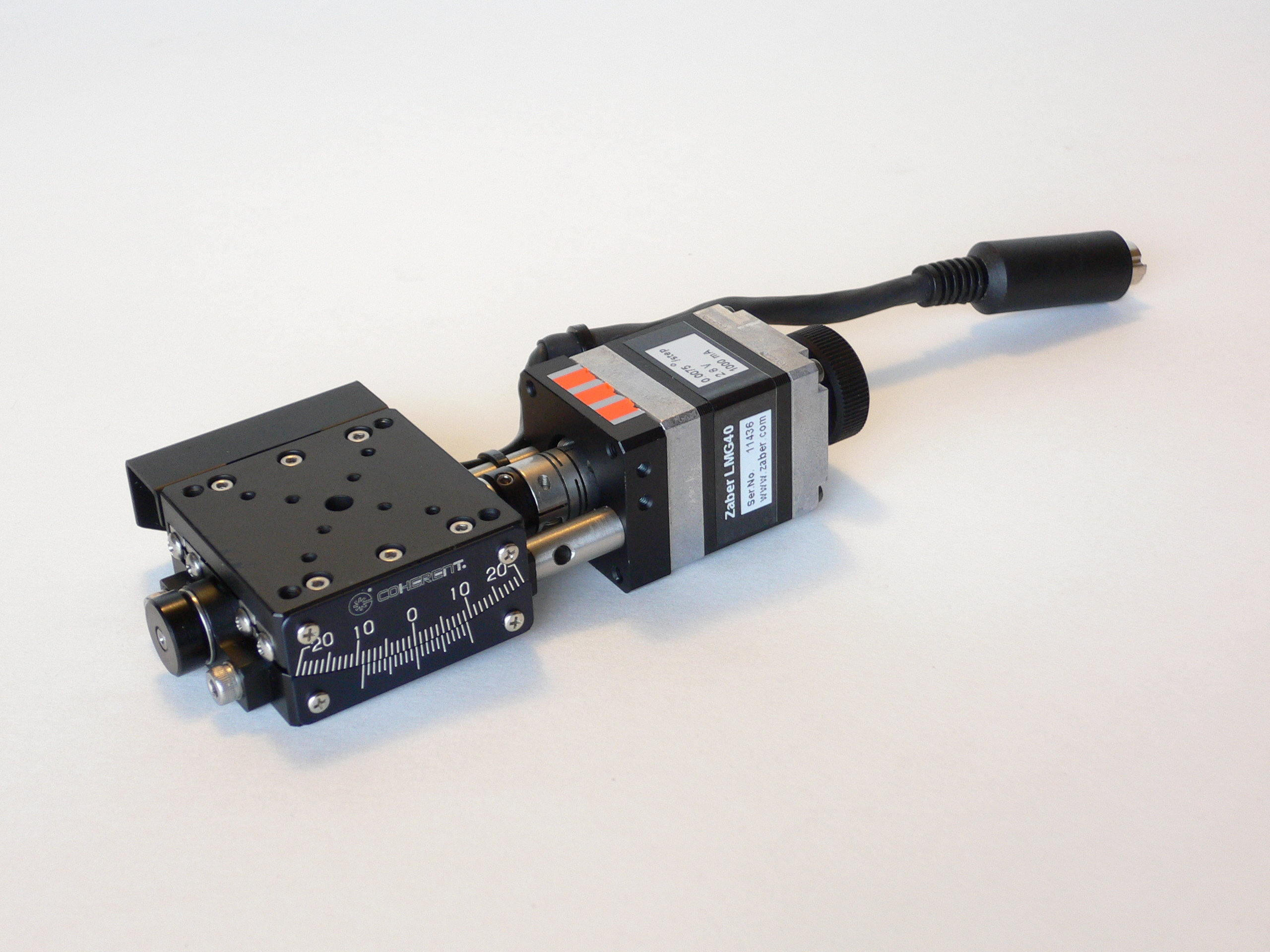
A miniature electro-mechanical goniometer stage manufactured by Zaber Technologies Inc . This type of stage is used primarily in the field of lasers and optics.

A positioning goniometer or goniometric stage is a device used to rotate an object precisely (within a small angular range) about a fixed axis in space. Its appearance is similar to that of a linear stage. However, rather than moving linearly with respect to its base, the stage platform rotates partially about a fixed axis above the mounting surface of the platform. The distance of the center of rotation from the platform mounting surface is often chosen so that two different goniometer models may be stacked in an X-Y configuration and both stages will rotate about the same point. Positioning goniometers typically use a worm drive with a partial worm wheel fixed to the underside of the stage platform meshing with a worm in the base. The worm may be rotated manually or by a motor as in automated positioning systems.

== See also ==
- Goniometer
- Indexing head
