= Motion system =

Component of test and measurement system

Motion system in engineering and systems, is a component of a test and measurement system that provides motion to a load or loads in a one or many directions. Generally a motion system is made up of a set (or stack) of linear and rotational stages. A linear stage moves in a straight line, while a rotation stage moves in a partial or full circle. A stage can either be manually controlled with a knob control, or automated with a motion controller.

A motion system generally is computer controlled and can perform fast, reliable, repeatable, and accurate positioning of loads. Most systems will support motion in the horizontal plane (x and y directions), which is referred to as an xy stack. Often either a vertical motion along the z axis (up/down motion) or rotational motion (r axis) is placed on top of the xy stack.

For automated stages, a scale can be attached to the internals of the stage and an encoder used to measure the position on the scale and report this to the controller, thereby determining the precise position of the stage. This allows for a motion controller to reliably and repeatably move to set positions with the linear stage.

== Gallery ==
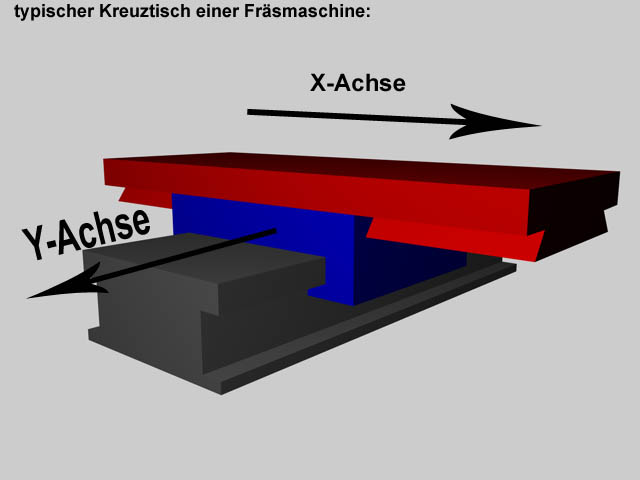
A coordinate table provides linear motion in an xy plane

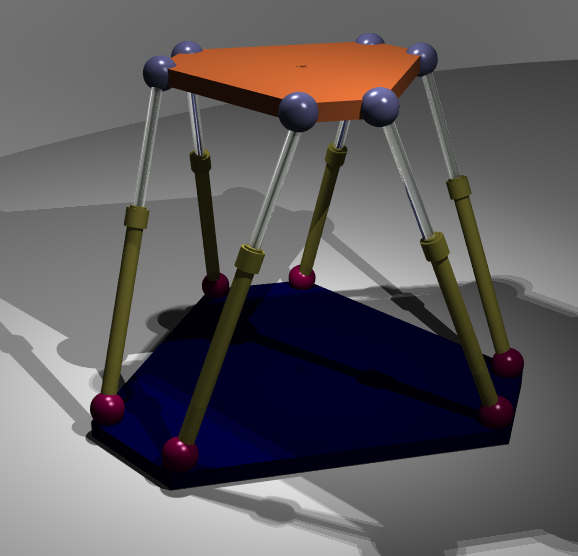
A hexapod, like a Stewart platform, provides six degrees of freedom

== See also ==
- Linear stage
- System of measurement
