= Pneumatic cylinder =

Mechanical device with compressed gas

Operation diagram of a single acting cylinder. The spring (red) can also be outside the cylinder, attached to the item being moved.

Operation diagram of a double acting cylinder

3D-animated pneumatic cylinder (CAD)

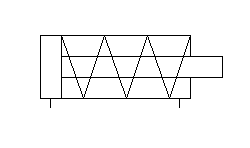
Schematic symbol for pneumatic cylinder with spring return

Pneumatic cylinder, also known as air cylinder, is a mechanical device which uses the power of compressed gas to produce a force in a reciprocating linear motion.

Like in a hydraulic cylinder, something forces a piston to move in the desired direction. The piston is a disc or cylinder, and the piston rod transfers the force it develops to the object to be moved. Engineers sometimes prefer to use pneumatics because they are quieter, cleaner, and do not require large amounts of space for fluid storage.

Because the operating fluid is a gas, leakage from a pneumatic cylinder will not drip out and contaminate the surroundings, making pneumatics more desirable where cleanliness is a requirement. For example, in the mechanical puppets of the Disney Tiki Room, pneumatics are used to prevent fluid from dripping onto people below the puppets.

== Operation ==
=== General ===
Once actuated, compressed air enters into the tube at one end of the piston and imparts force on the piston. Consequently, the piston becomes displaced.

=== Fail safe mechanisms ===
Pneumatic systems are often found in settings where even rare and brief system failure is unacceptable. In such situations, locks can sometimes serve as a safety mechanism in case of loss of air supply (or its pressure falling) and, thus remedy or abate any damage arising in such a situation. Leakage of air from the input or output reduces the output pressure.

== Types ==
Although pneumatic cylinders will vary in appearance, size and function, they generally fall into one of the specific categories shown below. However, there are also numerous other types of pneumatic cylinder available, many of which are designed to fulfill specific and specialized functions.

=== Single-acting cylinders ===
A single-acting cylinder (SAC) has one port, which allows compressed air to enter and for the rod to move in one direction only. The high pressure of the compressed air causes the rod to extend as the cylinder chamber continues to fill. When the compressed air leaves the cylinder through the same port the rod is returned to its original position.

=== Double-acting cylinders ===
Double-acting cylinders (DAC) use the force of air to move in both extend and retract strokes. They have two ports to allow air in, one for outstroke and one for instroke. Stroke length for this design is not limited, however, the piston rod is more vulnerable to buckling and bending. Additional calculations should be performed as well.

=== Multi-stage, telescoping cylinder ===
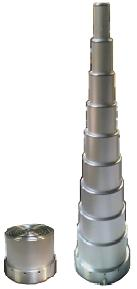
Pneumatic telescoping cylinder, 8-stages, single-acting, retracted and extended

Telescoping cylinders, also known as telescopic cylinders can be either single or double-acting. The telescoping cylinder incorporates a piston rod nested within a series of hollow stages of increasing diameter. Upon actuation, the piston rod and each succeeding stage "telescopes" out as a segmented piston. The main benefit of this design is the allowance for a notably longer stroke than would be achieved with a single-stage cylinder of the same collapsed (retracted) length. One cited drawback to telescoping cylinders is the increased potential for piston flexion due to the segmented piston design. Consequently, telescoping cylinders are primarily utilized in applications where the piston bears minimal side loading.

=== Other types ===
Although SACs and DACs are the most common types of pneumatic cylinder, the following types are not particularly rare:

- Through rod air cylinders: piston rod extends through both sides of the cylinder, allowing for equal forces and speeds on either side.
- Cushion end air cylinders: cylinders with regulated air exhaust to avoid impacts between the piston rod and the cylinder end cover.
- Rotary air cylinders: actuators that use air to impart a rotary motion.
- Rodless air cylinders: These have no piston rod. They are actuators that use a mechanical or magnetic coupling to impart force, typically to a table or other body that moves along the length of the cylinder body, but does not extend beyond it.
- Tandem air cylinder: two cylinders assembled in series
- Impact air cylinder: high velocity cylinders with specially designed end covers that withstand the impact of extending or retracting piston rods.

==== Rodless cylinders ====
Rodless cylinders have no rod, only a relatively long piston. Cable cylinders retain openings at one or both ends, but pass a flexible cable rather than a rod. This cable has a smooth plastic jacket for sealing purposes. A single cable has to be kept in tension. Other rodless cylinders close off both ends, coupling the piston either magnetically or mechanically to an actuator that runs along the outside of the cylinder. In the magnetic type, the cylinder is thin-walled and of a non-magnetic material, the cylinder is a powerful magnet, and pulls along a magnetic traveller on the outside.

In the mechanical type, part of the cylinder extends to the outside through a slot cut down the length of the cylinder. The slot is then sealed by flexible metal sealing bands on the inside (to prevent gas escape) and outside (to prevent contamination). The piston itself has two end seals, and between them, camming surfaces to "peel off" the seals ahead of the projecting linkage and to replace them behind. The interior of the piston, then, is at atmospheric pressure.

One well-known application of the mechanical type (albeit steam-powered) are the catapults used on many modern aircraft carriers.

== Design ==
=== Construction ===
Depending on the job specification, there are multiple forms of body constructions available:

- Tie rod cylinders: The most common cylinder constructions that can be used in many types of loads. Has been proven to be the safest form.
- Flanged-type cylinders: Fixed flanges are added to the ends of cylinder, however, this form of construction is more common in hydraulic cylinder construction.
- One-piece welded cylinders: Ends are welded or crimped to the tube, this form is inexpensive but makes the cylinder non-serviceable.
- Threaded end cylinders: Ends are screwed onto the tube body. The reduction of material can weaken the tube and may introduce thread concentricity problems to the system.

=== Material ===
Upon job specification, the material may be chosen. Material range from nickel-plated brass to aluminum, and even steel and stainless steel. Depending on the level of loads, humidity, temperature, and stroke lengths specified, the appropriate material may be selected.

=== Mounts ===
Depending on the location of the application and machinability, there exist different kinds of mounts for attaching pneumatic cylinders:

Types of Mount Ends
Rod End	Cylinder End
Plain	Plain
Threaded	Foot
Clevis	Bracket: single or double
Torque or eye	Trunnion
Flanged	Flanged
	Clevis etc.

=== Sizes ===
Air cylinders are available in a variety of sizes and can typically range from a small 2.5 mm (1/10 in) air cylinder, which might be used for picking up a small transistor or other electronic component, to 400 mm (16 in) diameter air cylinders which would impart enough force to lift a car. Some pneumatic cylinders reach 1,000 mm (39 in) in diameter, and are used in place of hydraulic cylinders for special circumstances where leaking hydraulic oil could impose an extreme hazard.

== Force and pressure relationships ==
=== Rod stresses ===
Due to the forces acting on the cylinder, the piston rod is the most stressed component and has to be designed to withstand high amounts of bending, tensile and compressive forces. Depending on how long the piston rod is, stresses can be calculated differently. If the rods length is less than 10 times the diameter, then it may be treated as a rigid body which has compressive or tensile forces acting on it. In which case the relationship is:

$$F = A \sigma$$

Where:

$F$ is the compressive or tensile force
$A$ is the cross-sectional area of the piston rod
$\sigma$ is the stress

However, if the length of the rod exceeds the 10 times the value of the diameter, then the rod needs to be treated as a column and buckling needs to be calculated as well.

=== Instroke and outstroke ===
Although the diameter of the piston and the force exerted by a cylinder are related, they are not directly proportional to one another. Additionally, the typical mathematical relationship between the two assumes that the air supply does not become saturated. Due to the effective cross sectional area reduced by the area of the piston rod, the instroke force is less than the outstroke force when both are powered pneumatically and by same supply of compressed gas.

The relationship between the force, radius, and pressure can derived from simple distributed load equation:

$$F_r = P A_e$$

Where:

$F_r$ is the resultant force
$P$ is the pressure or distributed load on the surface
$A_e$ is the effective cross sectional area the load is acting on

==== Outstroke ====
Using the distributed load equation provided the $A_e$ can be replaced with area of the piston surface where the pressure is acting on.

$$F_r = P ( \pi r^2 )$$

Where:

$F_r$ represents the resultant force
$r$ represents the radius of the piston
$\pi$ is pi, approximately equal to 3.14159.

==== Instroke ====
On instroke, the same relationship between force exerted, pressure and effective cross sectional area applies as discussed above for outstroke. However, since the cross sectional area is less than the piston area the relationship between force, pressure and radius is different. The calculation isn't more complicated though, since the effective cross sectional area is merely that of the piston surface minus the cross sectional area of the piston rod.

For instroke, therefore, the relationship between force exerted, pressure, radius of the piston, and radius of the piston rod, is as follows:

$$F_r = P (\pi r_1^2 - \pi r_2^2) = P \pi (r_1^2 - r_2^2)$$

Where:

$F_r$ represents the resultant force
$r_1$ represents the radius of the piston
$r_2$ represents the radius of the piston rod
$\pi$ is pi, approximately equal to 3.14159.

== See also ==
- Fluid dynamics
- Fluid power
- Hydraulics
- Hydraulic cylinder
- Pneumatic motor
- Pneumatics
- Tubular linear motor
- Linear actuator
