= Magway Ltd =

Freight transport system

Magway is a UK startup noted for its e-commerce and freight delivery system that aims to transport goods in pods that fit in new and existing 90 cm (35 in)-diameter pipes, underground and overground, reducing road congestion and air pollution. It uses linear magnetic motors to shuttle pods, designed to accommodate a standard delivery crate (or tote), at approximately 31 miles per hour (50 km/h).

Founded in 2017 by Rupert Cruise, an engineer on Elon Musk's Hyperloop project, and Phill Davies, a business expert, Magway secured a £0.65 million grant in 2018, through Innovate UK’s 'Emerging and Enabling Technologies' competition, to develop an operational demonstrator. In 2019, £1.58 million was raised through crowdfunding to fund a pilot scheme, and in 2020, Magway was awarded £1.9 million from the UK Government's 'Driving the Electric Revolution Challenge', an initiative launched to coincide with the first meeting of a new Cabinet committee focused on climate change. In September 2020, Magway completed its first full loop of test track in a warehouse in Wembley.

Primarily focused on two freight routes from large consolidation centres near London (Milton Keynes, Buckinghamshire and Hatfield, Hertfordshire) into Park Royal, a west London distribution centre, future plans involve installing 850 kilometres (530 mi) of track in decommissioned London gas pipelines, to deliver e-commerce goods from distribution centres direct to consumers in the capital. The design of the pipes is similar to the current underground pipe system in small tunnels that distribute water, gas, and electricity in the city. The pods are powered by electromagnetic wave from magnetic motors that are similar to those used in roller coasters. A proposed route that runs from Milton Keynes to London will have the capacity to transport more than 600 million parcels annually. Outside of urban areas, Magway plans to build its pipe system alongside motorways.
