= Uniform Plumbing Code =

Model plumbing safety code

IAPMO
- International Association of Plumbing and Mechanical Officials
- Founded: 1926
- Location: United States
- Key people: David Viola, CEO; David Gans, President; Steve Panelli, Vice President; Hugo Aguilar, Vice President of Codes and Standards; Enrique Gonzalez, Code Development Administrator
- Website: www.iapmo.org

Plumbing codes in use in the USA: Statewide adoption of the International Plumbing Code Local adoption of the International Plumbing Code Statewide adoption of Uniform Plumbing Code Local adoption of Uniform Plumbing Code Other state or local codes used

Designated as an American National Standard, the Uniform Plumbing Code (UPC) is a model code developed by the International Association of Plumbing and Mechanical Officials (IAPMO) to govern the installation and inspection of plumbing systems as a means of promoting the public's health, safety and welfare.

The UPC is developed using the American National Standards Institute's (ANSI) consensus development procedures. This process brings together volunteers representing a variety of viewpoints and interests to achieve consensus on plumbing practices.

The UPC is designed to provide consumers with safe and sanitary plumbing systems while, at the same time, allowing latitude for innovation and new technologies. The public at large is encouraged and invited to participate in IAPMO's open consensus code development process. This code is updated every three years. A code development timeline and other relevant information are available at IAPMO's website.

== Adoption ==
=== State-level adoption ===
- Washington
- Oregon
- California
- Alaska
- Hawai'i
- Idaho
- Nevada
- New Mexico
- Montana
- South Dakota
- North Dakota
- Minnesota
- Maine

== History ==
- On July 28, 1880, the City and County of San Francisco adopted Order No. 1,587 which covered "Prohibiting Offensive Trades, Occupations and Nuisances, and Defining Misdemeanors". This Order was divided into 69 Sections and Sections 4, 5, and 6 cover Privy Vaults. All three sections contain construction standards for privy vaults. Section 4 requires that privy be connected to the sewer by pipes made of "cement, iron-stone or iron" (ironstone, also known as Ironstone china is ceramic material similar to terra cotta and contains no iron). Section 5 requires that privy pits cannot be constructed without the prior approval of the Health Officer and that the walls and bottom be constructed of "stone or brick, laid in cement, and at least eight inches thick". Section 6 that privy vaults not release "nauseous, foul or offensive" odors.
- On June 4, 1881, New York City adopted a Plumbing Law which required all master plumbers to register with the Board of Health and that construction on projects with plumbing could not proceed until the Board of Health had approved the plumbing plans. The Board of Health was given power to restrain by injunction any construction that was not approved. The law makes it a misdemeanor to violate this law. A movement to create such a law had been active for five or six years but opposition from plumbers had prevented the adoption until 1881. Initially no funding was provided for inspections. 2,500 dollars was eventually provided in 1882 Inspections had begun in 1882 and by the end of the year 9,871 inspections had been completed The law required that only iron pipe be used. The law required that ferrules be made of brass or lead and not iron. Traps were required to be ventilated to a pipe that extends to two feet above the roof. All sinks, basins, and water closets need to have separate traps and there has to be trap at the junction with the sewer.
- In 1883 Senate Bill No. 132 was introduced by Senator Dougherty into the California legislature which was titled "An Act to grant to Boards of Health in cities and counties the power to regulate plumbing and drainage of buildings". The bill was passed and signed into law March 15 and became Chapter LXXVII [1]. The law has seven sections, Section 1 requires all master plumbers to be registered with the local Board of Health. Section 2 requires the local Boards of Health to publish annually a list of all registered master plumbers. Section 3 requires that no plumbing be installed until a written plan is submitted to the local Board of Health and it is approved. Section 4 requires local governments, counties, cities, special districts, to collect revenue to fund this activity. Section 5 Empowers local courts to enforce this law. Section 6 makes it a misdemeanor to violate this law and Section 7 makes the law effective immediately. Local government adopted local plumbing ordinances modeled after Chapter LXXVII. The City of San Francisco wrote and adopted a "plumbing law" by July 1883. San Francisco had begun work on the plumbing law before the state law had been signed by the governor. Governor Stoneman traveled to San Francisco after signing Senate Bill 132 to determine how the city planned to enforce their law The City of San Jose adopted "An ordinance in relation to the construction of house drains and plumbing work connecting with the sewerage system of the City of San Jose." on December 2, 1884 [1]. It was divided into 38 sections covering a wide range of topics. Section 32 requires the licensing of all people doing plumbing work and Section 34 requires all "drain layers" obtain a separate license from plumbers. Section 36 establishes a plumbing inspector. Section 3 does not allow any construction approval of the Inspector of Plumbing and Drainage. A written description of the proposed work is to be submitted in advance to the inspector for his approval. Section 16 mandates the use of cast iron for interior pipes and Section 12 mandates the use of "vitrified stone ware pipes" that "run under buildings". Sections 27, 28, 29, 30 and 31, included specifications for testing and general inspection of work done and the application of the ordinance to effecting connections with temporary sewers heretofore built on certain streets of the city. The City of Los Angeles also created an ordinance creating the Office of Plumbing Inspector as part of the city's Board of Health in 1887 [2] Later the City of Los Angeles adopted Ordinance No. 1656 May 1, 1893 [3] which established an examining board for master plumbers, registration of master and journeyman plumbers, requiring approval of the Board of Health for construction of plumbing infrastructure through a plumbing inspector, appropriate penalties, and various requirements for materials and construction covering 22 Sections. There were standards for pipe material in both ordinances. In the Los Angeles ordinance in Section 10 it states: "All soil and waste pipes within the building and all drains beneath the building or in the ground within three feet of the outside of the building shall be constructed in what is known to commerce as extra heavy cast iron soil pipe and fitting...". In Section 6 of the San Jose ordinance it says: "Every building or lot shall be sewered by an ironstone or cast iron pipe, extending from the building, or point of beginning, out to the line of the street sewer, and laid at a uniform grade throughout its entire length."In some cases the local ordinances followed the lead of the State Board of Health. In 1884 the State Board in its biennial report to the legislature notes that service lines between the mains and the house ("house-communication pipes") were generally made of lead [2] but ..."Hygiene cannot approve of their employment, for they are liable to be acted upon, especially by soft water, and in consequence there may be danger of lead poisoning to the consumer.". The majority of local plumbing ordinances required the use of wrought or cast iron and limited the use of lead pipes to connectors (goose-necks or pig-tails) or placed other restrictions on lead pipes. As noted above, the San Jose plumbing ordinance does not list lead as an approved pipe material which is similar to the Los Angeles ordinance however the Los Angeles ordinance does allow for some lead materials in certain situations. In Section 17 states: "All Joints in cast Iron soil pipe shall be packed with picked oakum and run with molten lead well caulked. All connections of lead with iron pipe must be made with a brass ferrule of the same size as the lead pipe and caulked into the iron pipe as specified for cast iron pipe and connected to with the lead pipe with a wiped joint"
- In 1884 Dr. Roger S. Tracy wrote "Hand-Book of Sanitary Information for Householders" which was published by D. Appleton and Company. The book contains "Facts and Suggestions about Ventilation, Drainage, Care of Contagious Diseases, Disinfection, Food, and Water". Dr. Tracy was the Sanitary Inspector of the New York City Health Department. The book is divided into five chapters and Chapter II is on "Drainage". Chapter II is the largest chapter at 45 pages and includes "Plumbing Regulations of the New York City Board of Health". On page 25 Dr. Tracy presents a "plan of construction" that was recommended by the Board of Health but no date is provided and it is not stated whether the city adopted this proposal or not. The Board of Health's plan consisted of 57 Sections covering many elements of a plumbing code. For example, Section 1 states: "All materials must be of good quality and free of defects; the work must be executed in a thorough and workmanlike manner" and Section 9 requires that house-drains be made of iron with a "fall of at least one quarter of an inch to the foot, if possible, and not more than one inch to the foot". The City of San Francisco would later require that plumbing inspectors pass an examination based upon Dr. Tracy's book.
- As early as the 1920'S there were widespread complaints in the construction industry, about inconsistency in the way building codes were being implemented. In 1920 the Senate Select Committee on Reconstruction and Production concluded: "The building codes of the country have not been developed upon scientific data, but rather on compromises; they are not uniform in principle and in many instances involve an additional cost of construction without assuring most useful or more durable buildings. Two years later, the newly appointed Secretary of Commerce Herbert Hoover reported to Congress that conflicting building codes were increasing construction costs by 10 to 20 percent. Secretary Hoover appointed a Building Code Committee to draft recommendations that could be used by local governments in preparing codes. The committee worked with the National Bureau of Standards until 1933, when funding was curtailed. In 1921 the Building Code Committee and in 1925 a report was issued titled "Recommended Practice for Arrangement of Building Codes" which consisted of 19 chapters, including Chapter 15 on plumbing. This report was known informally as the "Hoover Code" as it was issued under the signature of the Secretary of Commerce Herbert Hoover. Chapter 15 was itself divided into 14 Sections including topics such as Joints and connections, Water supply and distribution, and House drains and sewers.
- In 1926, a group of Los Angeles plumbing inspectors recognized that there were no uniform requirements for the installation and maintenance of plumbing systems, and at that point in time disease was rampant, a lot of it spread through improper sanitation. Disorder in the industry was the result of widely divergent plumbing practices and the use of many different, often conflicting, plumbing codes by local jurisdictions. It was these plumbing inspectors that understood the necessity of developing a model code that could be uniformly applied across jurisdictions.
- In 1928, the city adopted the first incarnation of a uniform plumbing code developed by the Los Angeles City Plumbing Inspectors Association (LACPIA) and based on the input from a committee of plumbing inspectors, master and journeyman plumbers, and sanitary and mechanical engineers, assisted by public utility companies and the plumbing industry.
- The product of this effort, the first edition of the Uniform Plumbing Code (UPC) was officially adopted by the Western Plumbing Officials Association in 1945, which later changed its name to IAPMO in 1966 when the scope of the association’s work increased. The code has been widely used over the past five decades by jurisdictions throughout the United States and internationally.
- With the publication of the 2003 Edition of the Uniform Plumbing Code, another significant milestone was reached. For the first time in the history of the United States, a plumbing code was developed through a true consensus process.
- The 2012 edition represents the most current approaches in the plumbing field and is the fourth edition developed under the ANSI consensus process. Contributions to the content of the code were made by every segment of the built industry, including such diverse interests as consumers, enforcing authorities, installers/maintainers, insurance, labor, manufacturers, research/standards/testing laboratories, special experts and users.
- The 2012 Uniform Plumbing Code is supported by the American Society of Sanitary Engineering (ASSE), the Mechanical Contractors Association of America (MCAA), the Plumbing-Heating-Cooling Contractors National Association (PHCC-NA), the United Association (UA) and the World Plumbing Council (WPC). These associations support IAPMO's open consensus process being used to develop IAPMO's codes and standards.

== 2018 Edition ==
The sixth edition to be designated as an American National Standard, the latest UPC includes the following key changes:

- New alternate water sources for nonpotable applications and nonpotable rainwater catchment systems

(Chapters 16, 17) based upon IAPMO's Green Plumbing and Mechanical Code Supplement

- New Appendix L (sustainable practices)
- New minimum plumbing facilities table (Chapter 4)
- Water supply and drainage joint connection requirements (Chapters 6, 7)

== Content ==
- Chapter 1 - Administration
- Chapter 2 - Definitions
- Chapter 3 - General Regulations
- Chapter 4 - Plumbing Fixtures and Fixture Fittings
- Chapter 5 - Water Heaters
- Chapter 6 - Water Supply and Distribution
- Chapter 7 - Sanitary Drainage
- Chapter 8 - Indirect Wastes
- Chapter 9 - Vents
- Chapter 10 - Traps and Interceptors
- Chapter 11 - Storm Drainage
- Chapter 12 - Fuel Piping
- Chapter 13 - Health Care Facilities and Medical Gas and Vacuum Systems
- Chapter 14 - Firestop Protection
- Chapter 15 - Alternate Water Sources for Nonpotable Applications
- Chapter 16 - Nonpotable Rainwater Catchment (Rainwater Harvesting) Systems
- Chapter 17 - Referenced Standards
- Appendix A - Recommended Rules for Sizing the Water supply System
- Appendix B - Explanatory Notes on Combination Waste and Vent Systems
- Appendix C - Alternate Plumbing Systems
- Appendix D - Sizing Storm Water Drainage Systems
- Appendix E - Manufactured/Mobile Home Parks and Recreational Vehicle Parks
- Appendix F - Firefighter Breathing Air Replenishment Systems
- Appendix G - Sizing of Venting Systems
- Appendix H - Private Sewage Disposal Systems
- Appendix I - Installation Standard
- Appendix J - Combination of Indoor and Outdoor Combustion and Ventilation Opening Design
- Appendix K - Potable Rainwater Catchment Systems
- Appendix L - Sustainable Practices
- Appendix M - Peak Water Demand Calculator

== See also ==
- IAPMO
- IAPMO Standards
- IAPMO R&T
- Uniform Codes
- Uniform Mechanical Code
- Uniform Solar Energy and Hydronics Code
- Uniform Swimming Pool, Spa and Hot Tub Code
- Building officials
- Building inspection
