= Uniform Mechanical Code =

Model code

IAPMO
- International Association of Plumbing and Mechanical Officials
- Founded: 1926
- Location: United States
- Key people: David Viola, CEO; David Gans, President; Steve Panelli, Vice President; Hugo Aguilar, Vice President of Codes and Standards; Zalmie Hussein, Code Development Administrator
- Website: www.iapmo.org

The Uniform Mechanical Code (UMC) is a model code developed by the International Association of Plumbing and Mechanical Officials (IAPMO) to govern the installation, inspection and maintenance of HVAC (heating, ventilating and air-conditioning) and refrigeration systems. It is designated as an American National Standard.

The UMC is developed using the American National Standards Institute's (ANSI) consensus development procedures. This process brings together volunteers representing a variety of viewpoints and interests to achieve consensus on mechanical issues.

The UMC is designed to provide consumers with safe mechanical systems while, at the same time, allowing latitude for innovation and new technologies. The public at large is encouraged to provide input for the development process. The code is updated every three years. A code development timeline and other relevant information are available at IAPMO's website.

== History ==
In 1926, a group of Los Angeles plumbing inspectors recognized that there were no uniform requirements for the installation and maintenance of plumbing systems. At that time, heating was done by boilers that piped the heat to radiators. Efficient air conditioning was not available. Widely divergent practices and the use of many different, often conflicting, plumbing codes by local jurisdictions led to plumbing systems that were incompatible and potentially dangerous. This underscored the necessity of developing a model code that could be uniformly applied across jurisdictions.

Two years later, the city adopted the first version of a uniform plumbing and mechanical code developed by the Los Angeles City Plumbing Inspectors Association (LACPIA) and based on the input from a committee of plumbing inspectors, master and journeyman plumbers, and mechanical engineers, assisted by public utility companies and the plumbing industry.

The ultimate product of this effort, the first Uniform Mechanical Code, was published by IAPMO, the new name for LACPIA, which was adopted in 1966 when the scope of mechanical work grew beyond plumbing and became more readily available in residential applications. in 1967. Over the last fifty years, this voluntary code has been adapted by jurisdictions not only throughout the United States, but internationally as well. The consensus development process was first applied to the 2003 edition.

The 2012 edition is the fourth edition developed under the ANSI consensus process. Contributions to the content of the code were made by every segment of the building industry, including such diverse interests as consumers, enforcing authorities, installers/maintainers, insurance, labor, manufacturers, research/standards/testing laboratories, special experts, and users. The 2012 Uniform Mechanical Code is supported by the American Society of Sanitary Engineering (ASSE), the Mechanical Contractors Association of America (MCAA), the Plumbing-Heating-Cooling Contractors National Association (PHCC-NA), the United Association (UA) and the World Plumbing Council (WPC).

== 2018 Edition ==
Major changes to the 2018 UMC include:

- New requirements for piping, tubing, balancing, louvers, protection of piping, mechanical systems and ductwork
- New provisions for evaporative cooling systems
- Refrigeration port protection requirement
- New requirements for piping, tubing and fittings used in hydronic systems

== 2021 Edition ==
Significant changes to the 2021 UMC include:

- New Appendix F – Geothermal Energy Systems
- New guards and rails requirements for installation of equipment and appliances on roofs
- New ventilation requirements for transient and nontransient occupancies
- New ventilation requirements for indoor air quality for residential occupancies
- Revisions to the requirements for air ducts, including factory-made air ducts and dampers
- New provisions for factory-built grease ducts
- New provisions for refrigeration systems, including pressure-limiting devices and hydrostatic expansion
- Revisions to the sizing requirements for natural gas and propane piping systems
- Modifications to the pressure rating requirements for hydronic piping applications
- New requirements for fuel gas piping appliance shutoff valves, test pressure and overpressure protection devices
- New tube fastener provisions for radiant heating and cooling
- New requirements for residential compressed natural gas (CNG) fueling systems
- New fire-extinguishing equipment and carbon monoxide detection requirements for exhaust systems

== Content ==
- Chapter 1 - Administration
- Chapter 2 - Definitions
- Chapter 3 - General Regulations
- Chapter 4 - Ventilation Air
- Chapter 5 - Exhaust Systems (Part 1: Environmental Air Ducts and Product Conveying Systems; Part 2: Commercial Hoods and Kitchen Ventilation)
- Chapter 6 - Duct Systems
- Chapter 7 - Combustion Air
- Chapter 8 - Chimney and Vents
- Chapter 9 - Installation of Specific Appliances
- Chapter 10 - Boilers and Pressure Vessels
- Chapter 11 - Refrigeration (Part 1: Refrigeration Systems; Part 2: Cooling Towers)
- Chapter 12 - Hydronics (Part 1: Steam and Water Piping; Part 2: Hydronic Panel Heating Systems)
- Chapter 13 - Fuel Gas Piping (Part 1: Fuel Piping; Part 2: Fuel Supply: Manufactured/Mobile Home Parks and Recreational Vehicle Parks)
- Chapter 14 - Process Piping
- Chapter 15 - Solar Energy Systems
- Chapter 16 - Stationary Power Plants
- Chapter 17 - Referenced Standards
- Appendix A - Residential Plans Examiner Review Form for HVAC System Design
- Appendix B - Procedures to be Followed to Place Gas Equipment in Operation
- Appendix C - Installation and Testing of Oil (Liquid) Fuel-Fired Equipment
- Appendix D - Fuel Supply: Manufactured/Mobile Home Parks and Recreational Vehicle Parks
- Appendix E - Sustainable Practices
- Appendix F - Geothermal Energy Systems
- Appendix G - Sizing of Venting Systems and Outdoor Combustion and Ventilation Opening Design
- Appendix H - Example Calculation of Outdoor Air Rate

== See also ==
- IAPMO
- IAPMO Standards
- IAPMO R&T
- Uniform Codes
- Uniform Plumbing Code
- Uniform Swimming Pool, Spa and Hot Tub Code
- Uniform Solar Energy and Hydronics Code
- Building officials
- Building inspection
