= IAPMO R&T =

Agency

- International Association of Plumbing and Mechanical Officials Research and Testing
- Founded: 1936
- Location: United States
- Key people: Jin Luo, senior director of Asia Pacific Operations/Laboratory Recognition; Ohannes Dembekjian, senior director of Continuous Compliance; Anish Desai, director of Product Certification
- Website: www.iapmort.org

IAPMO R&T (International Association of Plumbing and Mechanical Officials - Research and Testing) was started in 1936 as a third-party listing agency specializing in plumbing and mechanical products. IAPMO R&T is accredited to certify products that meet the criteria of the Uniform Plumbing Code, Uniform Mechanical Code, Uniform Solar Energy Code, Uniform Swimming Pool, Spa and Hot Tub Code and other nationally recognized codes and standards in North America.

IAPMO R&T is accredited by the American National Standards Institute (ANSI) and the Standards Council of Canada (SCC) as a third-party conformity assessment body. It operates a material and product listing and labeling system, providing certification services for plumbing, mechanical, and construction products.

The product listing (certification) process includes initial and ongoing product testing, a periodic inspection on current production of listed products, and making available a published report of the listed manufacturer and specific products that contain specific information regarding the material or product conformity to applicable standards and has been found safe for use in a specific manner.

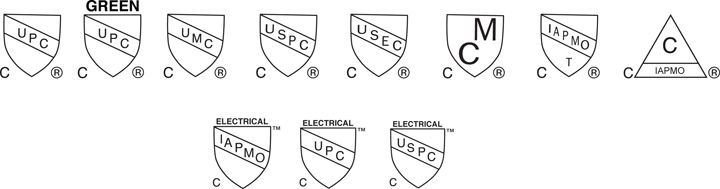
IAPMO certification marks are recognized by many authorities having jurisdiction in the United States, Canada, and other countries, including:

Recognizing the growing importance of water conservation, IAPMO R&T provides certification for the United States Environmental Protection Agency EPA WaterSense program, as well as certification to the Green Plumbing and Mechanical Code Supplement.

And in response to client demands, IAPMO R&T recently added two new services that include certification to other codes (e.g. International Plumbing Code) and the “two-in-one” certification for plastic pipes and fittings (NSF/ANSI 14 and equivalent ASTM standards).

== Process ==

- With Application, furnish one copy of detailed, dimensioned engineering drawings (8½” × 11” in size) of the product, which includes the location, text and type of the required Certification Mark and all markings required by the product standard, i.e., etched, glass-over label, raised letters, etc. For showers and shower receptors, drawings to a scale of 1" = 1' are required.
- Furnish one copy of a test report(s) from an IAPMO R&T listed laboratory indicating compliance with the appropriate product standard. A list of IAPMO R&T listed laboratories is available at www.iapmo.org. Test reports shall not be more than one year old and must be in the required format. (the fees for testing are directly charged by the selected laboratory.)
- Deliver, prepaid and without charge to the attention of the Product Certification Committee (PCC) at the Association's office a sample or samples of the product. The exact number of samples will be determined by the IAPMO R&T technical staff. Samples must bear prototype marking of the IAPMO R&T Certification Mark. IAPMO R&T will not be responsible for loss or damage to any materials submitted. Unless samples are claimed within two weeks of notice of listing, IAPMO R&T may dispose of such materials. The Association may, at its discretion, permanently retain any sample.
- Furnish a normal size photograph of each product submitted for listing. Each photograph should contain as much marking and identification detail as possible.
- Furnish one copy of the originals of the following: literature/brochures showing and describing the product, care and maintenance instructions, and installation instructions (color brochures may be used to satisfy this requirement).
- Furnish the street address, telephone number, name of the contact person at each plant and other information required in section 17 of the Listing Agreement for each location where the listed product is manufactured or warehoused or is to be manufactured or warehoused. This information is not required for component part manufacturing locations, but only for final assembly locations.

Acceptance by the Product Certification Committee (PCC) will be contingent upon the applicant furnishing to the Association's staff, appropriate production samples bearing the final appropriate markings prior to listing.

- For Electrical/Electro-Plumbing Product Certification: Provide 1 complete set of Bill of Materials, Electrical Schematics and Detailed Component List (Including: manufacturer, model, NRTL certification and complete electrical ratings).

== Customer Service ==
IAPMO R&T works directly with the manufacturer during the certification process.

- Product testing at laboratories recognized to the requirements of ISO/IEC 17025
- Expert review by committee on U.S. and Canadian Plumbing Codes for compliance to these codes
- Test reports reviewed by qualified engineers covering every necessary discipline
- Continuous compliance reviews performed
- Review of drawings and supporting documentation at the manufacturing site
- Review of manufacturer's Quality Assurance system for compliance

== Scope of Products Listed Worldwide ==
- Faucets
- Copper Tubing
- Toilets
- Backflow Preventers
- Drinking Water Treatment Units
- Electro-Plumbing Products
- Ducts, Boilers, Furnaces, Air Conditioners
- Swimming Pool, Spa and Hot Tub Products
- Solar-Energy Related Products: Photovoltaic and Thermal
- Precast Concrete Products
- Plastic Compounds
- Plastic Electrical Conduits
- Plastic Pipe Fittings and Compounds
- Manufactured Housing and Recreational Vehicle Product
- Product evaluation to ANSI/NSF 14 and ANSI/NSF 61 standards and the ability to have that compliance added to your company's certificate of listings
- An ISO 9001-2008 Program that can be customized to fit your company's unique needs––whether your company is small or large (IAPMO R&T is the only registrar dedicated to serving the plumbing industry)

== Scope of Product Testing and Certification ==
- Uniform Plumbing Code (UPC)
- International Plumbing Code (IPC)
- National Plumbing Code of Canada
- NSF/ANSI 61
- NSF/ANSI 14
- All North American Plumbing Standards
- UL 1431
- UL 1795
- UL 1563 or equivalent Canadian Standards
- UL 1951
- AB 1953 California Lead Plumbing Law
- Vermont and Other Lead Test
- Green

== Standards Development ==
For more than 30 years, IAPMO's standards-developing efforts have primarily focused on plumbing product standards. This concentration was primarily due to IAPMO members’ expertise from more than 50 years of writing and updating the Uniform Plumbing Code (UPC).

Recently, IAPMO's efforts have broadened to include standards for mechanical products. Drawing on their years of experience, many IAPMO members have also contributed to the development of the Uniform Mechanical Code (UMC). Mechanical product standards cover heating, ventilation, cooling and refrigeration system products.

IAPMO also publishes standards covering products used in the Recreational Vehicle and Manufactured Housing Industry called IAPMO Trailer Standards.

The IAPMO Standards Department represents IAPMO in many standards-writing organizations throughout North America. These organizations include the American National Standards Institute (ANSI), the American Society for Testing and Materials (ASTM), the American Society of Mechanical Engineers (ASME), the American Society of Sanitary Engineering (ASSE), the Canadian Standards Association (CSA) and the Recreational Vehicle Industry Association (RVIA).

The IAPMO Standards Department is also involved in its own standards work. IAPMO publishes more than 200 current standards. These standards have been developed through IAPMO's standards development process. Many IAPMO standards have been developed into nationally recognized consensus standards in conjunction with organizations such as ANSI, ASME, ASSE and ASTM. The IAPMO Standards Department is also an ANSI-accredited Standard Development Organization (SDO), which develops and publishes IAPMO/ANSI consensus standards such as the Z124 documents for plastic plumbing products and the Z1000 series documents for waste disposal products.

IAPMO Guide Criteria

The IAPMO Standards Department works with industry to provide an opportunity for the development of new standards when no applicable standard exists for a product. Often, new products or technologies surge ahead far faster than many standards can keep pace. Through the IAPMO Guide Criteria (IGC) procedure, IAPMO provides manufacturers and product developers an opportunity to draft IAPMO standards as a vehicle for introducing new products. Once an IGC is accepted, IAPMO R&T can list products manufactured in compliance with the new requirements.

IAPMO Standards Review Committee

The IAPMO Standards Review Committee meets monthly to review all proposed new standards and standards changes submitted to IAPMO. These meetings are open to members of industry and the public at large. All sides have the opportunity to present their views and supporting information on the proposals discussed at these meetings. Proposals voted on by the Standards Review Committee are posted for 20 days on the IAPMO Standards Development Program 20 Day Public Review Website for public comment.

Revising or Developing IAPMO Standards

Proposals may be submitted to IAPMO's Standards Department for revisions to existing IAPMO Standards or to develop new standards if no applicable standard exists for a product. Applications and fee schedules are available at iapmostandards.org. Proposals and Applications must be submitted before the 26th of the month and will be reviewed by the Standards Review Committee (SRC) at the following monthly meeting.

== See also ==
- IAPMO
- IAPMO Standards
- Uniform Codes
- Uniform Mechanical Code
- Uniform Plumbing Code
- Uniform Swimming Pool, Spa and Hot Tub Code
- Uniform Solar Energy and Hydronics Code
- Building officials
