= Chartered Institute of Plumbing and Heating Engineering =

UK professional body

- Abbreviation: CIPHE
- Predecessor: National Association of Master Plumbers
- Merged into: 1970: Registered Plumbers Association; 2019: Institute of Domestic Heating and Environmental Engineering
- Formation: 1906; 120 years ago
- Type: Nonprofit
- Registration no.: Charity 1124517; Company RC000822
- Legal status: Active
- Headquarters: Capricorn Centre, Basildon
- Location: London, United Kingdom
- Coordinates: 51.7424963°N 0.4809952°E
- Region served: United Kingdom
- Members: ▲6,617 (2022)
- President: Paul Daley
- Chairman: Ernie McDonald
- Board of directors: 9 trustees
- Affiliations: Construction Industry Council; Engineering Council; Build UK; World Plumbing Council
- Budget: (2022)
- Revenue: ▲£1.05m (2022)
- Expenses: ▲£1.05m (2022)
- Endowment: ▲£94.79k (2022)
- Staff: 12 (2026)
- Website: www.ciphe.org.uk
- Formerly called: Institute of Plumbers; Institute of Plumbing

The Chartered Institute of Plumbing and Heating Engineering (CIPHE) is the professional body for the plumbing and heating industry in the United Kingdom. It was founded as the Institute of Plumbers in 1906. It received a royal charter in 2008. It has more than 7,500 members.

== History ==
The original Institute of Plumbers was established in 1906 to develop both industrial and technical aspects of the plumbing trade, but the industrial and commercial aspects were taken over by what is today known as the Association of Plumbing and Heating Contractors (APHC) in 1925. The Institute then concentrated on education, training and technical matters, becoming the Institute of Plumbing in 1957.

The Institute merged with the Registered Plumbers Association in January 1970, taking on management of the Register of Plumbers (created in 1886) on behalf of the Worshipful Company of Plumbers. In 1979, the Institute became a registered educational charity to protect the health and safety of the public through a strong qualified membership reinforced by their competency and technical expertise, and to create technical excellence so the public will receive the benefit of a protected environment and enhanced sustainability with improved safety and health.

In 2004, it became the Institute of Plumbing and Heating Engineering. Four years later, it was granted a royal charter, becoming the Chartered Institute of Plumbing and Heating Engineering in July 2008.

In November 2019, the Institute of Domestic Heating and Environmental Engineering was amalgamated into the Chartered Institute of Plumbing and Heating Engineering membership, creating a single professional body representing the UK plumbing and heating industry.

== Membership ==
As at 31 December 2022, its membership comprises more than 7,500 individuals, including consultants, specifiers, designers, public health engineers, lecturers, trainers, trainees and practitioners.

As a professional engineering institute, members of the CIPHE are entitled to apply to register via the Engineering Council as Engineering Technician (EngTech), Incorporated Engineer (IEng) and Chartered Engineer (CEng).

== Affiliations ==
The CIPHE is a member of the Construction Industry Council, the Engineering Council and Build UK. Through its CEO, the CIPHE is represented on the World Plumbing Council and the WaterSafe Approved Installers Scheme.
