= Hot water storage tank =

Tank used for storing hot water for heating or domestic use

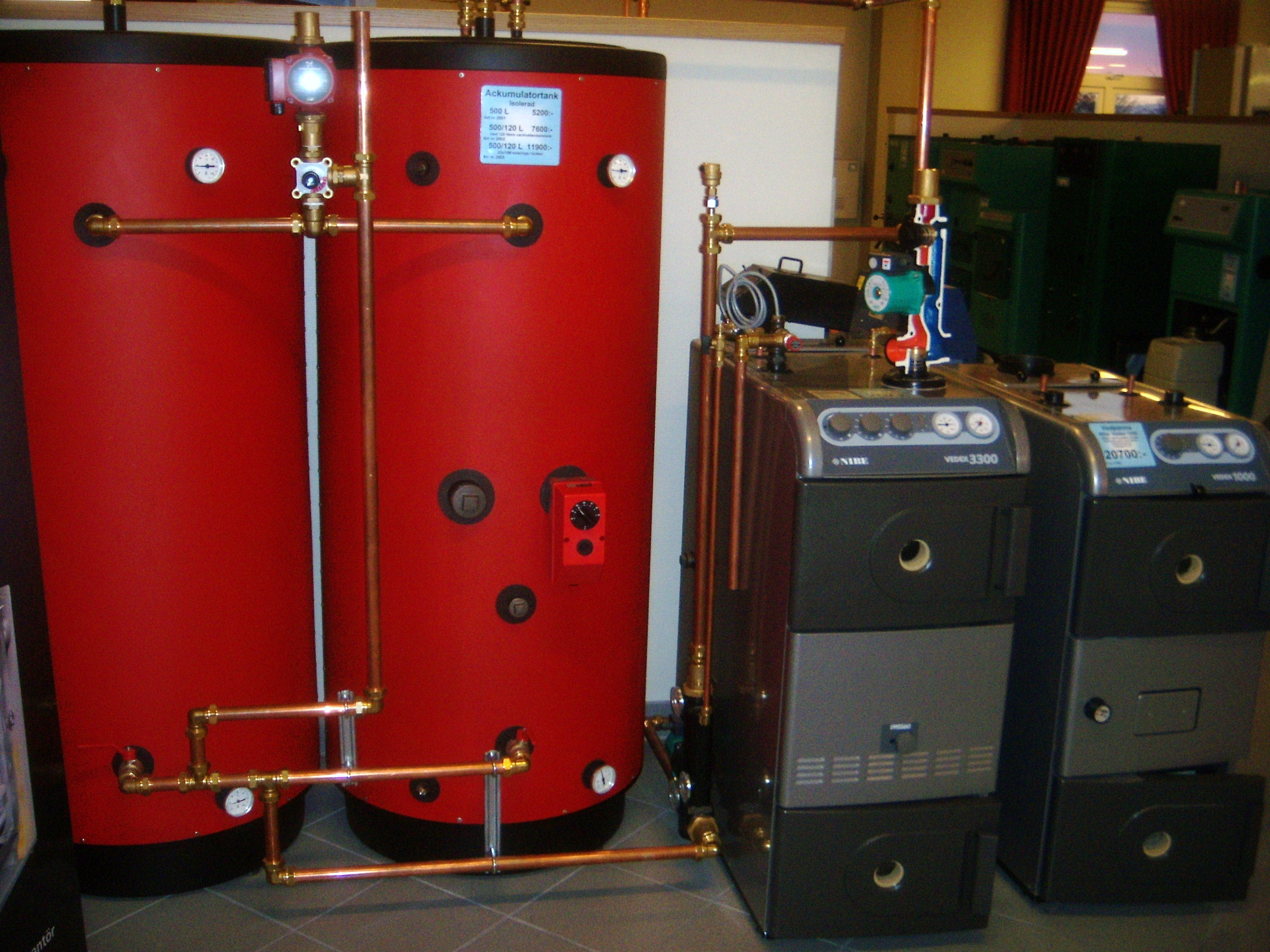
Two paralleled red hot water storage tanks connected to a wood-fuelled furnace.

A hot water storage tank where one of the heat sources is solar heating A, that is sent into the hot water storage tank via a smaller pump B (circle with triangle) and the heat exchanger spiral in the hot water storage tank. The other spiral C can be used for a e.g. oil-fired boiler or a wood burner. At D the hot water gets out and domestic cold water is sent back at the bottom at E.

A hot water storage tank where one of the heat sources is solar heating. Almost the same example as above, but in a domestic habitat.

A hot water storage tank (also called a hot water tank, thermal storage tank, hot water thermal storage unit, heat storage tank, hot water cylinder, and geyser) is a water tank used for storing hot water for space heating or domestic use.

Water is a good heat storage medium because it has a high specific heat capacity and also a high volumetric heat capacity. This means, compared to other substances, it can store more heat per unit of volume and much more per unit of weight. Water is non-toxic and very low cost.

A well insulated tank can retain stored heat for days to months, depending on size and thickness of insulation. Hot water tanks may have a built-in gas or oil burner system, and/or electric immersion heaters. Some types use an external heat exchanger such as a central heating system, or heated water from another energy source. The most typical, in the domestic context, are a fossil-fuel burner, electric immersion elements, or a district heating scheme.

Water heaters for washing, bathing, or laundry have thermostat controls to regulate the temperature, in the range of 40 to 60 °C (104 to 140 °F), and are connected to the domestic cold water supply.

Where the local water supply has a high content of dissolved minerals such as limestone, heating the water causes the minerals to precipitate in the tank (scaling). A tank may develop leaks due to corrosion after only a few years, a problem exacerbated by dissolved oxygen in the water which accelerates corrosion of both tank and fittings. When the water in the tank is not exchanged, as in heating systems, scaling and corrosion cease once the oxygen and the minerals in the water are used up.

== Insulation ==
Typically hot water storage tanks are wrapped in heat insulation to reduce energy consumption, speed up the heating process, and maintain the desired operating temperature. Thicker thermal insulation reduces standby heat loss. Water heaters are available with various insulation ratings but it is possible to add layers of extra insulation on the outside of a water heater to reduce heat loss. In extreme conditions, the heater itself might be wholly enclosed in a specially constructed insulated space.

The most commonly available type of water heater insulation is fiberglass, fixed in place with tape or straps or the outer jacket of the water heater. Insulation must not block air flow or combustion gas outflow, where a burner is used.

Another common insulation material used for water storage tanks is polyurethane foam (PUF) insulation. Where access to the inner tank is a priority (in cases of particularly aggressive minerals or oxygen levels in the local water supply) the PUF can be applied in encapsulated form, allowing the removal of insulation layer for regular integrity checks and if required, repairs to the water tank.

Vacuum insulation technology is now making it possible to store thermal energy in small to medium-sized systems for weeks without any significant heat losses.

== Solar hot water storage tank ==
In a solar water heating system, a solar hot water storage tank stores heat from solar thermal collectors. The tank has a built-in heat-exchanger to heat domestic cold water. In relatively mild climates, such as the Mediterranean, the (heavily insulated but metal-wrapped) storage tanks are often roof-mounted. All such tanks share the same problems as artificially-heated tanks including limestone deposit and corrosion, and suffer similar reductions in overall efficiency unless scrupulously maintained.

== Water tank leakage ==
Water heater tanks may be made of vitreous enamel-lined carbon steel, stainless steel, or copper.

While copper and stainless steel domestic hot water tanks are more commonplace in Europe, carbon steel tanks are more common in the United States, where typically the periodic check is neglected, the tank develops a leak whereupon the entire appliance is replaced. Even when neglected, carbon steel tanks tend to last for a few years more than their manufacturer's warranty, which is typically 3 to 12 years in the US.

Vitreous-lined tanks are much lower in initial cost, and often include one or more sacrificial anode rods designed to protect the tank from perforation caused by corrosion made necessary since chlorinated water is very corrosive to carbon steel. As it is very nearly impossible to apply any protective coating perfectly (without microscopic cracks or pinhole defects in the protective layer) manufacturers may recommend a periodic check of any sacrificial anode, replacing it when necessary.

Some manufacturers offer an extended warranty kit that includes a replacement anode rod. Because conventional hot water storage tanks can be expected to leak every 5 to 15 years, high-quality installations will include, and most US building/plumbing codes now require, a shallow metal or plastic pan to collect the seepage when it occurs.

== Hot water storage tank with closed water circuit ==
This method stores heat in a tank by using external heat-exchangers (coils) that can be directly tapped or used to power other (external) heat-exchangers.

The chief benefit is that by avoiding drawing-off domestic hot water directly, the tank is not continually fed with cold water, which in 'hard' water areas reduces the deposit of limescale to whatever is dissolved in the original charge of water plus relatively trivial amounts added to replace losses due to seepage.

An added benefit is reduced oxygen levels in such a closed system, which allows for some relaxation in the requirements for materials used in the hot water storage tank and the closed water circuits, external heat exchangers, and associated pipework.

While an external heat exchanger system used for domestic hot water will have mineral deposits, descaling agents extend the life of such a system.

== Stratified hot water storage tank with closed water circuit ==
Another method to store heat in a hot water storage tank has many names: Stratified hot water storage tank with closed water circuit, stratified thermal storage, thermocline tank and water stratified tank storage but in all cases the significant difference is that pains are taken to maintain the vertical stratification of the water column, in other words to keep the hot water at the top of the tank while the water at the bottom is at a distinctly lower temperature.

This is desirable in places with a wide climatic range where summer cooling is as important as heating in winter, and entails one or more of the following measures:

- Different heating and cooling loops must send the heated or cooled water in with as low a velocity as possible. (This necessarily entails heating and cooling loops having velocity controlled pumps and tube ports with the maximum feasible diameter.)
- For cooling applications, cool water is sent out from the bottom and warm (return) water is fed in at the top.
- Heating applications get hot water out at the top and return cool water to the bottom.
- "Stratification-enhancing" devices within the hot water storage tank (but if the water inlet velocity is as low as possible this might not be needed).
- A more advanced heat control system is required.

When a stratified hot water storage tank has closed water circuits, the water temperatures can be up to 90 to 95 °C at the top and 20 to 40 °C at the bottom. Calm, undisturbed water is a relatively poor heat conductor when compared to glass, bricks and soil.

(Illustrated by a still lake, where the surface water can be comfortably warm for swimming but deeper layers be so cold as to represent a danger to swimmers, the same effect as gives rise to notices in London's city docks warning 'Danger Cold Deep Water).

Accordingly, an arbitrary volume of hot water can be stored, as long as the stratification is kept intact. In this case there must not be vertical metal plates or tubes as they would conduct heat through the water layers, defeating the purpose of stratification. When effectively employed this technique can maintain water as high as 95 °C (i.e. just below boiling) yielding a higher energy density, and this energy can be stored a long time provided the hot water remains undiluted.

Depending on the purpose of the installations, water exchanges tapping different levels allow water temperatures appropriate to the required use to be selected.

In many solar heating systems the energy parameters can be read as a function of time, from the 'dwell' time necessary to transform daylight into heat, at its peak the maximum hot water temperature near the top of the tank.

== Dual element electric ==
When flow starts from the uppermost outlet, cold water enters the tank at the bottom. This drop in temperature causes the thermostat to switch on the electric heating element at the bottom of the tank. When the water at the top of the tank is drawn off the hot water at the top is displaced by relatively cooler water, the top thermostat turns the top element on. When the flow stops, the elements stay on until their settings are met.

While it is common to have the top and bottom thermostats set differently in order to save energy, the fact that hot water rises means the thermostat controlling the upper element should feed the hottest supply, while the lower element the warmest.

If the thermostats in such a system are reversed - warm feed from the top, hot from the center - it may not only affect the energy efficiency of the system, feeding scalding water to a domestic hot water outlet may be dangerous, or if directed to warm-feed washers damage them beyond repair.

== Safety issues ==
Hot water can cause painful, dangerous scalding injuries, especially in children and the elderly. Water at the outlet should not exceed 49 degrees Celsius. Some jurisdictions set a limit of 49 degrees on tank setpoint temperature. On the other hand, water stored below 60 degrees Celsius can permit the growth of bacteria, such as those that cause Legionnaires' disease, which is a particular danger to those with compromised immune systems. One technical solution would be use of mixing valves at outlets used for sinks, baths or showers, that would automatically mix cold water to maintain a maximum below 49 C. A proposal to add this to the building code of Canada was unsuccessful.

== See also ==
- Uniform Mechanical Code
- Uniform Plumbing Code
- Uniform Solar Energy and Hydronics Code
