= Layered charge storage =

Water storage tank for solar thermal energy

Layered or stratified charge storage is hot water storage tank, typically for solar thermal energy. The warmest storage layer is the top storage cylinder and below this there are colder storage layers through natural layering. The water is fed into different storage levels, depending on the available feed temperature and current temperature layering. The feed takes place via a vertical line via holes, in each case the feed water is fed into the storage layer with the corresponding water temperature. This is achieved without valves, feeding the respective temperature or water density into the temperature layer. The advantage is that there is no mixing of the storage temperature. Swirling of the water is therefore to be avoided as far as possible in stratified storage tanks because this could lead to intermingling of storage layers. This is reduced by means of measures such as limiting flow velocity and baffle plates at the inlets.

Heating is therefore only necessary later, since warm water can be taken from above for longer, as opposed to mixed storage. In addition, water can be drawn with almost the same temperature very quickly after filling with hot water, since not all of the storage tank has to be heated. This optimises energy efficiency.

At the moment, they are generally more expensive than combined storage tank, but the storage volume can be a bit smaller and they are considered more modern because of better energy consumption.

In addition to storage for, for example, single-family houses with a few hundred to over one thousand litres, they can also be found in larger and significantly larger forms, for example, as long-term thermal storage tanks with a few thousand litres of storage volume.

Areas of application

- For solar thermal systems, to bridge periods of no sun
- For wood heating, since wood heating is otherwise difficult to control
- If a heat pump is installed in order to maintain blocking and standstill times
- For combined heat and power plants, to use them more efficiently
- For connecting different heating systems
