= Uniform Swimming Pool, Spa and Hot Tub Code =

IAPMO
- International Association of Plumbing and Mechanical Officials
- Founded: 1926
- Location: United States
- Key people: GP Russ Chaney, CEO; David Straub, President; David Gans, Vice President; Hugo Aguilar, Vice President of Codes and Standards;Enrique Gonzalez, Code Development Administrator
- Website: www.iapmo.org

Designated as an American National Standard, the Uniform Swimming Pool, Spa and Hot Tub Code (USPSHTC) is a model code developed by the International Association of Plumbing and Mechanical Officials (IAPMO) to govern the installation and inspection of plumbing systems associated with swimming pools, spas and hot tubs as a means of promoting the public's health, safety and welfare.

The USPSHTC is developed using the American National Standards Institute's consensus development procedures. This process brings together volunteers representing a variety of viewpoints and interests to achieve consensus on plumbing practices.

== History ==
The advantages of a Uniform Swimming Pool, Spa and Hot Tub Code, acceptable in various jurisdictions, had long been recognized, prompting IAPMO to pass a resolution at its 1975 annual business conference that directed the president to form a committee to develop a basic swimming pool, spa and hot tub document.

After months of concerted endeavor, this committee, composed of representatives from industry and public utility companies, inspectors, plumbers and engineers, successfully completed the first edition of the Uniform Swimming Pool, Spa and Hot Tub Code, which was officially adopted by IAPMO in September 1976.

== 2012 edition ==
The 2012 USPSHTC is designed as a scientifically sound model code that is supported in an effort to reduce risk and promote safe and healthy recreational water experience through performance standards, while at the same time, allowing latitude for innovation and new technologies.

The 2012 USPSHTC is the second edition developed under the ANSI consensus process. Contributions to the content of the code were made by every segment of the built industry, including such diverse interests as consumers, enforcing authorities, installers/maintainers, labor, manufacturers, research/standards/testing laboratories, special experts and users.

Key changes to the 2012 edition include:

- Two new materials (PE-RT and Polyproplene) approved for building supply and water distribution piping and fittings including their applicable standards.
- Joining methods were added to address material for building supply and water distribution piping and fittings.
- New chapter added for the design, materials and methods of construction, facilities and decks as they pertain to public and private swimming pools, spas and hot tubs including structural design, testing, dimensions for floor and wall slopes, markings, maximum bathing load, public facilities, decks, and lightning protection systems.
- New chapter added for general safety equipment as they pertain to swimming pools, spas and hot tubs including means of entry and exits including steps, ladders, stairs, barrier requirements, safety covers, chemicals, signage and water clarity.

== Content ==
- Chapter 1 - Administration
- Chapter 2 - Definitions
- Chapter 3 - General Requirements
- Chapter 4 - Design, Materials and Methods of Construction
- Chapter 5 - Water Quality
- Chapter 6 - Equipment
- Chapter 7 - Heaters
- Chapter 8 - Safety
- Chapter 9 - Aquatic Recreational Attractions
- Chapter 10 - Referenced Standards

== See also ==
- IAPMO
- IAPMO Standards
- IAPMO R&T
- Uniform Codes
- Uniform Plumbing Code
- Uniform Mechanical Code
- Uniform Solar Energy and Hydronics Code
- Building officials
- Building inspection
