= IAPMO Standards =

IAPMO
- International Association of Plumbing and Mechanical Officials
- Location: United States
- Key people: Hugo Aguilar, Vice President of Codes and Standards; Kyle Thompson, Manager of Standards Development
- Website: www.iapmo.org

IAPMO Standards are the plumbing and mechanical standards of the International Association of Plumbing and Mechanical Officials (IAPMO). For more than thirty years, IAPMO's standards-developing efforts have primarily focused on plumbing product standards. This concentration was primarily due to IAPMO members’ expertise from more than 50 years of writing and updating the Uniform Plumbing Code (UPC). IAPMO is an American National Standards Institute (ANSI)-recognized Standards Development Organization (SDO).

Recently, IAPMO's efforts have broadened to include standards for mechanical products. Drawing on their years of experience, many IAPMO members have also contributed to the development of the Uniform Mechanical Code (UMC). Mechanical product standards cover heating, ventilation, cooling and refrigeration system products.

IAPMO also publishes standards covering products used in the Recreational Vehicle and Manufactured Housing Industry called IAPMO Trailer Standards.

== See also ==
- IAPMO
- IAPMO R&T
- Uniform Codes
- Uniform Mechanical Code
- Uniform Plumbing Code
- Uniform Swimming Pool, Spa and Hot Tub Code
- Uniform Solar Energy and Hydronics Code
- Building officials
