= Uniform Solar Energy and Hydronics Code =

IAPMO
- International Association of Plumbing and Mechanical Officials
- Founded: 1926
- Location: United States
- Key people: Dave Viola, CEO; Jeremy Stettler, President; Brian Hamner, Vice President; Hugo Aguilar, Senior Vice President of Codes and Standards Development
- Website: www.iapmo.org

Designated as an American National Standard, the Uniform Solar, Hydronics and Geothermal Code (USHGC) is a model code developed by IAPMO to govern the installation and inspection of solar energy, hydronic heating/cooling systems, and geothermal energy systems as a means of promoting the public's health, safety and welfare.

The USHGC is developed using the American National Standards Institute's consensus development procedures. This process brings together volunteers representing a variety of viewpoints and interests to achieve consensus on solar energy, hydronic heating/cooling systems, and geothermal energy practices.

== History ==
Recognizing the necessity for a solar energy code to be adopted by jurisdictions as a means of regulating such systems, IAPMO passed a resolution at its 1975 annual business conference to form a technical committee for the development of such a document.

After several months of work, this committee, composed of individuals representing industry, public utility companies, inspectors, plumbers, and engineers, completed the Uniform Solar Energy Code's (USEC) first edition and in September 1976 this document was adopted by IAPMO.

In December 2011, the Radiant Professionals Alliance joined IAPMO and soon after work began to incorporate hydronic heating/cooling provisions into the USEC to be released in 2015 as the Uniform Solar Energy and Hydronics Code (USEHC).

== 2018 Edition ==
Though geothermal energy is not new in the 2018 edition, the title for the 2018 edition was revised to clarify that the code also pertains to geothermal energy systems. The 2018 Uniform Solar, Hydronics and Geothermal Code (USHGC) represents the most current approaches in the solar energy, hydronics and geothermal field.

== Content ==
- Chapter 1 - Administration
- Chapter 2 - Definitions
- Chapter 3 - General Regulations
- Chapter 4 - Hydronics
- Chapter 5 - Solar Thermal Systems
- Chapter 6 - Thermal Storage
- Chapter 7 - Geothermal Energy Systems
- Chapter 8 - Duct Systems
- Chapter 9 - Solar Photovoltaic Systems
- Chapter 10 - Referenced Standards
- Appendix A - Engineered Solar Energy Systems
- Appendix B - Solar Photovoltaic System Installation Guidelines
- Appendix C - Supplemental Checklist for Solar Photovoltaic Systems

== See also ==
- IAPMO
- IAPMO Standards
- IAPMO R&T
- Thermal energy storage
- Uniform Codes
- Uniform Plumbing Code
- Uniform Mechanical Code
- Uniform Swimming Pool, Spa and Hot Tub Code
- Building officials
- Building inspection
