= APHC =

APHC can stand for the following:

- A Prairie Home Companion, US weekly radio program
- All Parties Hurriyat Conference, a coalition of political parties in Kashmir
- Andhra Pradesh High Court, the ultimate legal authority in that state of India
- Anglo-Philippine Holdings Corporation, a Philippines financial consortium investing in mass-transit operations
- Appaloosa Horse Club (ApHC), a US horse breeding organization
- Armor-piercing hard core, a military designation for projectile types
- Association of Plumbing and Heating Contractors, a trade association in England and Wales
