= Combined storage tanks =

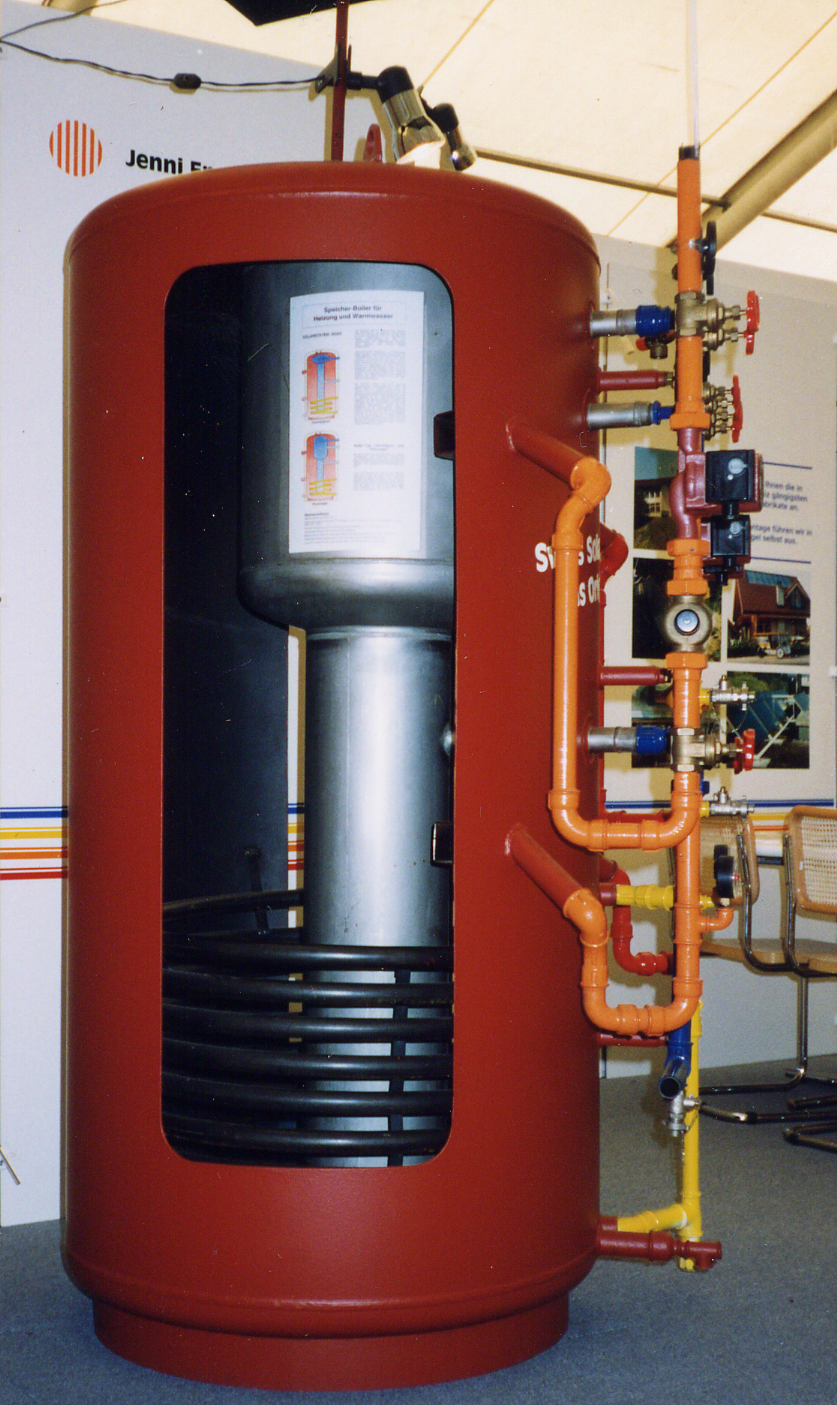
Tank-in-tank storage cut open

A combined storage tank combines hot water storage both for heating support and drinking water heating in a larger tank. As a result, warm water, typically from solar thermal energy, is stored temporarily for both purposes for later consumption. Breaks in sunshine can thus be bridged without any additional heating, depending on the heating requirement and storage size. This generally takes up less space than two individual buffer tanks and thermal losses are thereby reduced. These storage tanks are mostly insulated on the outside and designed for the lowest possible heat losses. Usually, it is a tank-in-tank system, that is, a two-compartment system arranged one inside the other. It is thus a combined buffer storage tank with a heat exchange plate in between. Above is a smaller interior tank for drinking water, i.e. water for showers, washing etc. and around it on the outside is a much larger storage volume for heating water for room heating.

An alternative is the layer charge storage tank, where the warmest storage layer is located at the top of the tank and colder layers below. The advantage of this is that different temperatures cannot be mixed and warm water can be used for longer. The layer storage tank is considered the most modern type of storage in this field. For drinking water heating, a fresh water station is used in the throughflow principle with a heat exchanger, which reduces the risk of legionella formation and is therefore even more hygienic.

This leads to efficiency optimisation together with an intelligent loading and unloading control. Both are especially useful if combined with what is called a low-temperature heating system and good building insulation, which makes the energy more effective.
