= Pipe-in-pipe system =

Form of plumbing

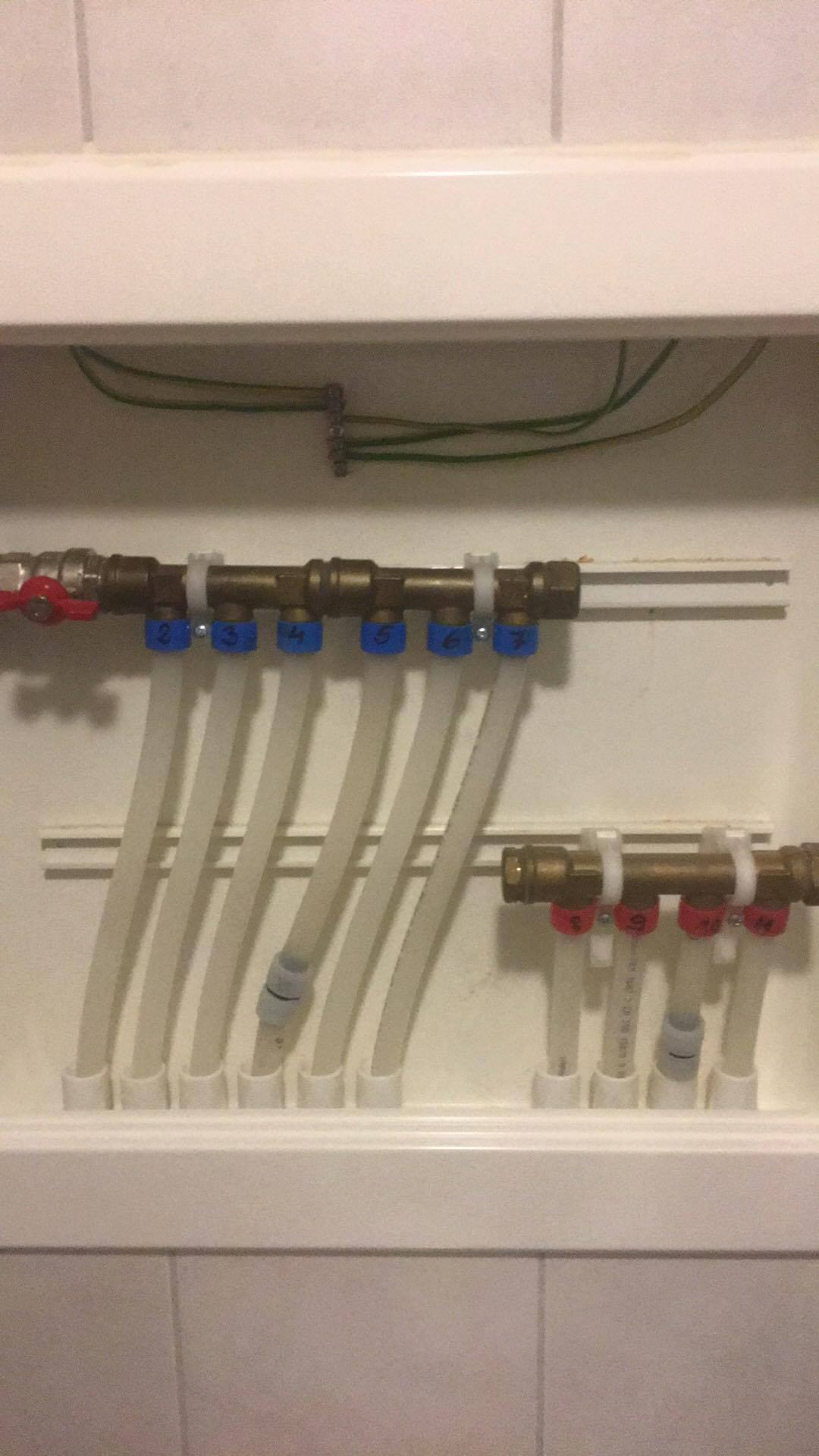
A water distribution cabinet with a pipe-in-pipe system. Internal pipes can be seen entering the external pipes in the bottom of the cabinet. In case of an internal leak, water will overflow through the external piping and can be detected inside the cabinet.

A pipe-in-pipe system is a form of plumbing where all water pipes are running inside another pipe. Its purpose is to ensure that any leaks in the innermost pipe will not leak into the building structure and can be detected, as well as make for easier change of any internal pipes with leakage without opening the walls.

== Parts ==
A pipe-in-pipe system consists of four main components: an inner pipe, an outer pipe, wall boxes, and a distribution cabinet.

== Legal requirements ==
In Norway, domestic plumbing based on pipe-in-pipe systems (known as: rør-i-rør system) was introduced in 1995, and has since become a legal requirement in all new houses being built. Due to experience with water damages with many traditional copper pipes in Norway between 1970 and 1995, new requirements came in 1997 stating that water pipes should be easily accessible for replacement after installation. These requirements have since lead to the current de facto requirement for pipe-in-pipe plumbing.

== Operation ==
During normal operation, the water flows through the inner water pipe, which is enclosed by the outer goods pipe. The plumbing leads back to a centrally located distribution cabinet where the pipes to all tapping points of the home are gathered in one place. In the event of any damage and leakage to the internal pipes, the external pipes must ensure that the water leak is safely diverted to the distribution cabinet where it is made visible for inspection before it is lead to a room with drains in the floor. It can be advantageous to install a water leak sensor and connect it to an automatic water stop valve which closes the water supply. In the event of visible leaks, there must also be an easily accessible manual main shut-off valve which must stop water supply to all pipes.

== Installation and repairs ==
Due to the way pipe-in-pipe systems are installed using flexible internal and external pipes, it is possible to pull out and replace the water pipes without having to open up walls. To ensure this, it is important that the outer pipes are clamped properly and securely so that they remain attached to the building structure, while also not being damaged. This is an absolutely crucial factor for how easy it is to change the water pipes, and the clamping rings used should be attached near wall boxes and distribution cabinets.

== Water hammer ==
In addition to proper clamping of the external pipes to the building structure, proper clamping of the distributors inside the distribution cabinet is also important to avoid water hammers when taps are closed rapidly. Pipe-in-pipe systems may be more susceptible or vulnerable to water hammers, and are therefore recommended to be used together with soft closing water taps.
