= Standing loss =

Energy loss in heat storage systems

Standing loss, or standing losses, is a non-technical term to define energy losses in a system, usually associated with heat and hot water storage systems. It is the amount of energy lost through heat transfer to the surrounding environment; as such it is directly related to how well insulated a system is. A hot water storage tank, for example, will have a standing loss of heat; a proportion of the heat generated for consumption is lost through the cylinder walls by heat transfer, and useful heat provided to the end use (e.g., a hot water tap) is reduced. Standing losses are also associated with any pipework distribution system that is employed in the system as well. Standing losses are usually expressed as a unit of thermal energy such as in watts, or as a percentage or ratio of the heat input provided to the system. It is clearly desirable for standing losses to be designed to be as small as possible by the use of improved insulation. Most countries in Europe have an energy efficiency directive target that must be met and this legislation also covers allowable standing losses in such heating and hot water systems and their distribution networks.
