= Association of Plumbing and Heating Contractors =

The Association of Plumbing and Heating Contractors (APHC) is a trade association for the plumbing and heating industry in England and Wales. It represents around 1500 businesses employing some 60,000 specialist engineers ranging from those employed by large companies to sole traders working in domestic properties.

The APHC represented these specialists on the Specialist Engineering Contractors Group, a member of the Strategic Forum for Construction.

== History ==
The APHC started in 1925 as the National Federation of Plumbers and Domestic Engineers, focused on industrial and commercial aspects of plumbing that had previously been managed by the Institute of Plumbers (today the Chartered Institute of Plumbing and Heating Engineering, CIPHE), which remained focused on education, training and technical matters.

It became the National Federation of Plumbers and Domestic Heating Engineers in 1965 to reflect the increased amount of members' work on heating systems. In 1972 it became an association: the National Association of Plumbing, Heating and Mechanical Services Contractors. It adopted its current name in 1996.
