= World Organisation of Building Officials =

World Organisation of Building Officials (WOBO) is the global association of building officials that promote the interests and technical standards of building officials. An association with the United Nations is to act as a clearing house of technical information on behalf of member states. For example, members have a role in the World Urban Forum, held in June 2006 in Canada. WOBO was founded in 1984 at a conference of representatives from ten nations meeting in Saskatoon.
