= Building officials =

Building officials of developed countries are generally the jurisdictional administrator of building and construction codes, engineering calculation supervision, permits, facilities management, and accepted construction procedures.

== Qualifications ==
In some jurisdictions building officials act as project engineer or project manager for the chief building official who is the jurisdiction's formally recognized building official. Usual qualifications are a bachelor's degree in Administration, Engineering, or Architecture, or Building Surveying or Construction Management, with an extensive building construction background, and in some instances are licensed as a Professional Engineer or Architect or Building Surveyors or Building Certifiers. Building officials can be certified by meeting certain requirements.

== Australia ==
=== Law ===
Australian law is governed under individual state laws & territories generally made from state Acts & Regulations governing ... Qld, NSW, Vic, Tas, South Aust, West Aust, Nth Territory, Aust Capital Territory, various off shore islands & Aust protectorates within the 200 nautical mile limit of the Commonwealth of Australia.

=== Town Planning & Development ===
Concepts of planning & development are primarily approved under state Town Planning Acts & Regulations, which outline the procedures & protocols for various types of projects.

Town Planning is a separate university degree discipline, which is usually guided by the interest of the general community & attempts to solve development problems.

Individual project concepts are approved under Local Authority Codes which are generally Council Town Planners acting as the preliminary Assessment Authority to issue preliminary development approvals, or state bodies, e.g. Transport, Main Roads, Port or Airport Authorities. Town Planners deal with expected community concepts, according to zoning principles ie residential land, high density living, city hubs, farm land, industrial areas, infrastructure, the safety of the natural environment & its natural resources.

=== Building & Construction ===
Australian Building law is governed under individual state laws & territories generally made from state Building Acts & Building Regulations

Within the state Acts & Regulations, the procedures & protocols of preliminary approvals required are outlined, before a building development permit is issued by the Licensed Building Certifier or Building Assessment Manager for various types of projects. The Acts also detail time frame limitations, registration & licensing body requirements of building professionals, practitioners & trade contractors. Offences & penalties are also gazetted under the Acts for proven non-compliance with minimum requirements. Appeals of development decisions can be undertaken via state tribunals or state Planning Courts.

Building officials, or regulators that decide if building applications for construction works can proceed, are called Building Surveyors or Building Certifiers.

These officials are either employed by Federal, State or Local Government or more commonly in private practice companies. Building Surveying is a tertiary degree qualification & encompasses all aspects of construction from the concept stage to the finished building.

The Architect, Designer, Builder or Owner engage the Licensed Building Certifier/Building Surveyor as the Building Assessment Manager, to regulate or manage a project, on behalf of the local authority (usually Council), generally after a preliminary approval is required, or to determine that a project meets all the relevant minimum Planning Code requirements, under the Building Certifier's guidance, or as part of a discretionary process.

The Building Certifier interacts with all professionals & often the Senior trade contractors engaged within the building & inspects the works as they proceed, during mandatory inspection phases of footings, slab, frame, fire separation & final, to ensure compliance with the approved plans, the NCC & relevant Australian Standards. Building Surveyors or Building Certifiers are licensed by the state they practice in & have 3 different levels.

Building Surveyors were first conceived after the Great Fire of London in 1666 in the UK, where their primary focus is the safe construction & use of the building concerning the life-health & safety of the occupants.

=== Plumbing Works ===
Plumbing works are generally approved & inspected at various stages, by the Local Authority (Council) Plumbing Inspectors who have a Hydraulic/Plumbing trade qualification & experience, to ensure public potable water safety, contain the spread waste-water products & regulate responsible ground water discharge. Larger infrastructure i.e. dams, pipe line networks, roadway drainage, flood mitigation works, etc, calls for a Civil Engineering background.

=== National Construction Code (NCC) ===
All state building acts & regulations refer to the minimum standards required within the Building Code of Australia (BCA), now the National Construction Code (NCC) since 2011, of which there are 3 volumes, which deals with individual aspects of buildings in categorised sections, based on the use (class), size of the building & type of construction, A, B or C, where Type C is the least fire resistant.

Volume 1 - Buildings classes 2 to 9 - larger commercial buildings - ie 2 residential units, 3 motels, 4 caretakers residence in a larger building, 5 office, 6 shop, 7 warehouse, 8 factory, 9 public buildings e.g. schools, hospitals, etc.

Volume 2 - Buildings classes 1 & 10 - smaller residential buildings ie 1A house, 1B small residential boarding house, 10A carport, 10B swimming pool.

Volume 3 - Plumbing & Drainage - including fire fighting, gas, solar water heating, air con & on site waste water systems - for all buildings & external civil works.

The NCC is up-graded bi-annually to consider new products, improvements or methods of construction, by senior officials of trade bodies, Institutes of Architects /Engineers / Building Surveyors, state officials & governed by the Australian Building Codes Board (ACBC). The NCC references individual minimum Australian Standards (AS- No.- Year of introduction) for each aspect of the type of contractor's work, or suppliers product, e.g. the minimum standard for Waterproofing of wet areas uses AS 3740-2004.

In Australia, the valuation for sale of a project is another discipline of Building Valuer, unlike the UK where the Building Valuer is the Building Surveyor.

== New Zealand ==
The government of New Zealand has set up a mediation service to resolve cases of houses that failed watertightness.

== United States ==
In the United States, there were three major nonprofit organizations developing building codes for the governing of building constructions, but they have since been merged into one in 1994, the International Code Council (ICC). ICC publishes the International Building Codes, used by most of the jurisdictions within the United States. The former organizations included Building Officials and Code Administrators International, Inc. (BOCA), International Conference of Building Officials (ICBO), and Southern Building Code Congress International, Inc. (SBCCI).

There are several other major code publishers in the United States. The Uniform Plumbing Code (UPC) and the Uniform Mechanical Code (UMC) are both written by the International Association of Plumbing and Mechanical Officials, also known as IAPMO, an organization that was established by code officials.

On May 17, 1926, the International Association of Plumbing and Mechanical Officials, or IAPMO, began with a mandate “to advance the latest and most improved methods of sanitation; to promote the welfare of and harmony between the owner, the builder, and the craftsman; to accomplish a uniformity in the application of the provisions of the ordinances; and to promulgate the mutual benefit of the members." IAPMO also publishes the Uniform Solar Energy and Hydronics Code (USEHC) and Uniform Swimming Pool, Spa and Hot Tub Code (USPSHTC) as part of their family of Uniform Codes.

== England and Wales ==
In England and Wales building control bodies (BCBs) may be either established under Local Authority control or private bodies (Approved Inspectors). Applicants wishing to carry out work controlled under the Building Act have the choice to select either the local Building Control or an Approved Inspector. However, where local legislation is prevalent the Approved Inspector will be charged with liaising with the relevant local authority body for the necessary approvals.

The Secretary of State issues guidance in support of the Building Regulations in the form of Approved Documents which are not mandatory. The Building Regulations are functional and therefore designers are free to offer alternative solutions to satisfying the functional requirements. The burden of proof is then placed on the designers to demonstrate that the alternative solution proposed offers a level of performance which satisfies the intent of the functional requirement. There is nothing in the Regulations which imposes a duty on the applicant under those circumstances to use the guidance as a benchmark of performance, although this is of course a route often taken as a way of demonstrating that an alternative approach is of an acceptable standard.

Appeals against decisions made by BCBs are to the Secretary of State who will make a determination after considering all of the facts of a particular case.

== See also ==
- Architecture
- Architectural engineering
- Architects
- Australian Building Codes Board
- Building code
- Building inspection
- Building Construction
- Construction engineering
- Civil engineering
- IAPMO
- International Building Code
- Land Zoning Code
- National Construction Code
- Structural Engineering
- Structural Engineer
- Uniform Codes
- Uniform Mechanical Code
- Uniform Plumbing Code
- Uniform Solar Energy and Hydronics Code
- Uniform Swimming Pool, Spa and Hot Tub Code
- World Organisation of Building Officials
