= Uniform Codes =

IAPMO
- International Association of Plumbing and Mechanical Officials
- Founded: 1926
- Location: United States
- Key people: GP Russ Chaney, CEO; David Straub, President; David Gans, Vice President; Hugo Aguilar, Vice President of Codes and Standards; Zalmie Hussein, Mechanical Code Development Administrator; Enrique Gonzalez, Plumbing Code Development Administrator
- Website: www.iapmo.org

Uniform Codes are codes of practice developed and maintained by the International Association of Plumbing and Mechanical Officials (IAPMO) using the American National Standards Institute's (ANSI) accredited consensus development process working on a three-year cycle. This process brings together volunteers representing a variety of viewpoints and interests to achieve consensus.

== Uniform codes ==
The Uniform Codes are used to meet the specific needs of individual jurisdictions both in the United States and abroad. The Uniform family of codes consists of:

- Uniform Plumbing Code
- Uniform Mechanical Code
- Uniform Solar Energy and Hydronics Code
- Uniform Swimming Pool, Spa and Hot Tub Code

== See also ==
- IAPMO R&T
- IAPMO Standards
- Uniform Plumbing Code
- Uniform Mechanical Code
- Uniform Solar Energy and Hydronics Code
