= IAPMO =

- International Association of Plumbing and Mechanical Officials
- Founded: 1926
- Headquarters: Ontario, California
- Location: United States
- Key people: David Viola, CEO; Jeremy Stettler, President; Brian Hamner, Vice President
- Website: www.iapmo.org

IAPMO (the International Association of Plumbing and Mechanical Officials) is a global team of experts delivering codes and standards, product testing, certification and inspection services, and professional development for a safer built environment.

IAPMO facilitates the development of and publishes codes and standards including its flagship Uniform Plumbing Code (UPC®) and Uniform Mechanical Code (UMC®), featuring its UPC, UMC and UES certification marks that serve as a consistent model for building professionals, manufacturers and researchers.

== Overview ==
IAPMO develops and publishes the UPC, UMC, Uniform Swimming Pool, Spa and Hot Tub Code (USPSHTC), Uniform Solar, Hydronics and Geothermal Code (USHGC), and Water Efficiency and Sanitation Standard (WE-Stand), American National Standards developed using the American National Standards Institute's (ANSI) accredited consensus development procedures.

== History ==
IAPMO was founded on May 17, 1926, with the mandate "to advance the latest and most improved methods of sanitation; to promote the welfare of and harmony between the owner, the builder, and the craftsman; to accomplish a uniformity in the application of the provisions of the ordinances; and to promulgate the mutual benefit of the members."

The founding members of IAPMO first gathered to begin writing a model code to protect the health of the people they served from inept plumbing practices. There were 39 Southern California plumbing inspectors in the first group, including Charles Collard, the association's first president, and Stephen Smoot, who served as association secretary from 1926 to 1954.

IAPMO's Uniform Codes are now utilized worldwide.

== See also ==
- IAPMO R&T
- Uniform Codes
- Building officials
- IAPMO Standards
- Uniform Mechanical Code
- Uniform Swimming Pool, Spa and Hot Tub Code
