= Building inspection =

Procedure to ensure building quality

A building inspection is an inspection performed by a building inspector, a person who is employed by either a city, township or county and is usually certified in one or more disciplines qualifying them to make professional judgment about whether a building meets building code requirements. A building inspector may be certified either as a residential or commercial building inspector, as a plumbing, electrical or mechanical inspector, or other specialty-focused inspector who may inspect structures at different stages of completion. Building inspectors may charge a direct fee or a building permit fee. Inspectors may also be able to hold up construction work until the inspection has been completed and approved.

Some building inspection expertises like facade inspections are required by certain cities or counties and considered mandatory. These are to be done by engineers and not by contractors. An example of a city that adopted this law is Quebec followed by a fatal incident that occurred due to negligence of the state of a facade. These inspections are often included in a contracted building inspection. However, they might not be carefully analyzed and diagnosed like an engineer would.

== Building inspectors ==
Building inspectors are often employed by governments and are frequently certified by the State, the International Code Council (ICC), or the Certified Commercial Property Inspectors Association (CCPIA) though are not always required to have any certification. Inspections are done to assure compliance with building, plumbing, electrical, mechanical or specialty codes, such as swimming pool codes, that are being enforced by the jurisdiction in which they work. There are many categories and levels of ICC certified inspectors.

Building inspectors are often contacted by strata managers or body corporate with storm water design issues, structural design proposals or civil design modifications. In addition, individuals are often required by councils to carry out dilapidation reports and building inspections of adjoining properties and associated council properties before and after construction, to establish that no damage has occurred due to the work carried out. Additional functions of a Building Inspector often include the evaluation of existing structures which have been subjected to physical damage from earthquakes, wind events, floods and fire, as well as investigations involving non-permitted construction.

Consulting engineers often carry out structural building inspections for strata properties where there are structural elements of the building found to be unsafe. Whether it is the balconies, balustrades or cracking due to settlement in the walls, consulting engineers provide building inspections of the property and make the appropriate assessment and provide dilapidation reports followed by proposals for remedial action.

== See also ==
- Home inspection
- Investment rating for real estate
- Real estate appraisal
