= World Plumbing Council =

The World Plumbing Council (WPC) is an international organization of plumbing associations and plumbing industry participants. There are currently over 200 WPC members from more than 30 countries around the world.

The event takes place on March 11 every year, initiated by the WPC to raise awareness of health, safety and sustainability as it pertains to plumbing.

The WPC hosts the World Plumbing Conference once every three years. The last conference was in September 2019 in Melbourne, Australia.
