= Pipe (fluid conveyance) =

Tubular section or hollow cylinder

Piping system

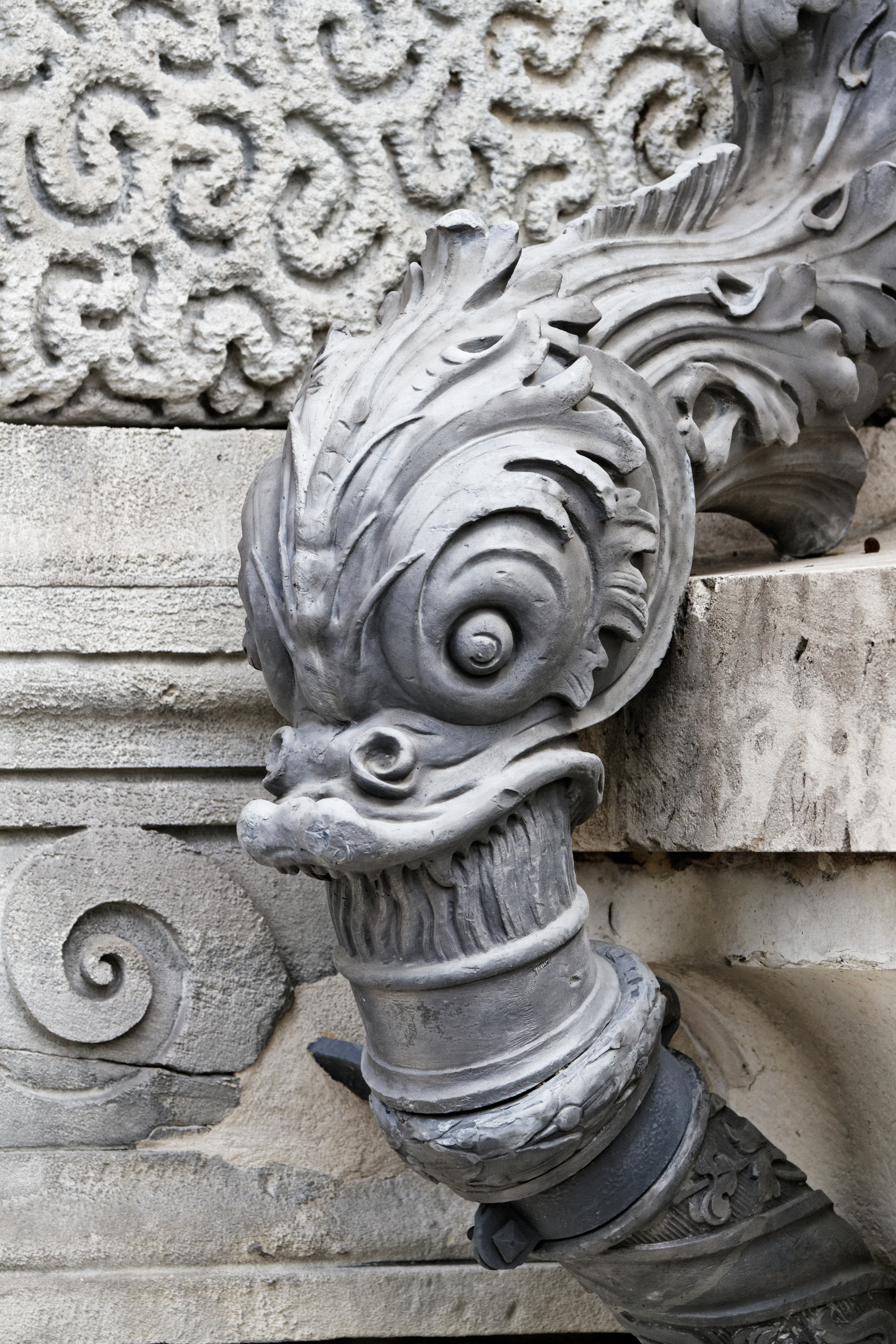
Drain pipe of the Louvre

A pipe is a tubular section or hollow cylinder, usually but not necessarily of circular cross-section, used mainly to convey substances which can flow — liquids and gases (fluids), slurries, powders and masses of small solids. It can also be used for structural applications; a hollow pipe is far stiffer per unit weight than the solid members.

In common usage the words pipe and tube are usually interchangeable, but in industry and engineering, the terms are uniquely defined. Depending on the applicable standard to which it is manufactured, pipe is generally specified by a nominal diameter with a constant outside diameter (OD) and a schedule that defines the thickness. Tube is most often specified by the OD and wall thickness, but may be specified by any two of OD, inside diameter (ID), and wall thickness. Pipe is generally manufactured to one of several international and national industrial standards. While similar standards exist for specific industry application tubing, tube is often made to custom sizes and a broader range of diameters and tolerances. Many industrial and government standards exist for the production of pipe and tubing. The term "tube" is also commonly applied to non-cylindrical sections, i.e., square or rectangular tubing. In general, "pipe" is the more common term in most of the world, whereas "tube" is more widely used in the United States.

Both "pipe" and "tube" imply a level of rigidity and permanence, whereas a hose (or hosepipe) is usually portable and flexible. Pipe assemblies are almost always constructed with the use of fittings such as elbows, tees, and so on, while tube may be formed or bent into custom configurations. For materials that are inflexible, cannot be formed, or where construction is governed by codes or standards, tube assemblies are also constructed with the use of tube fittings.

== Uses ==
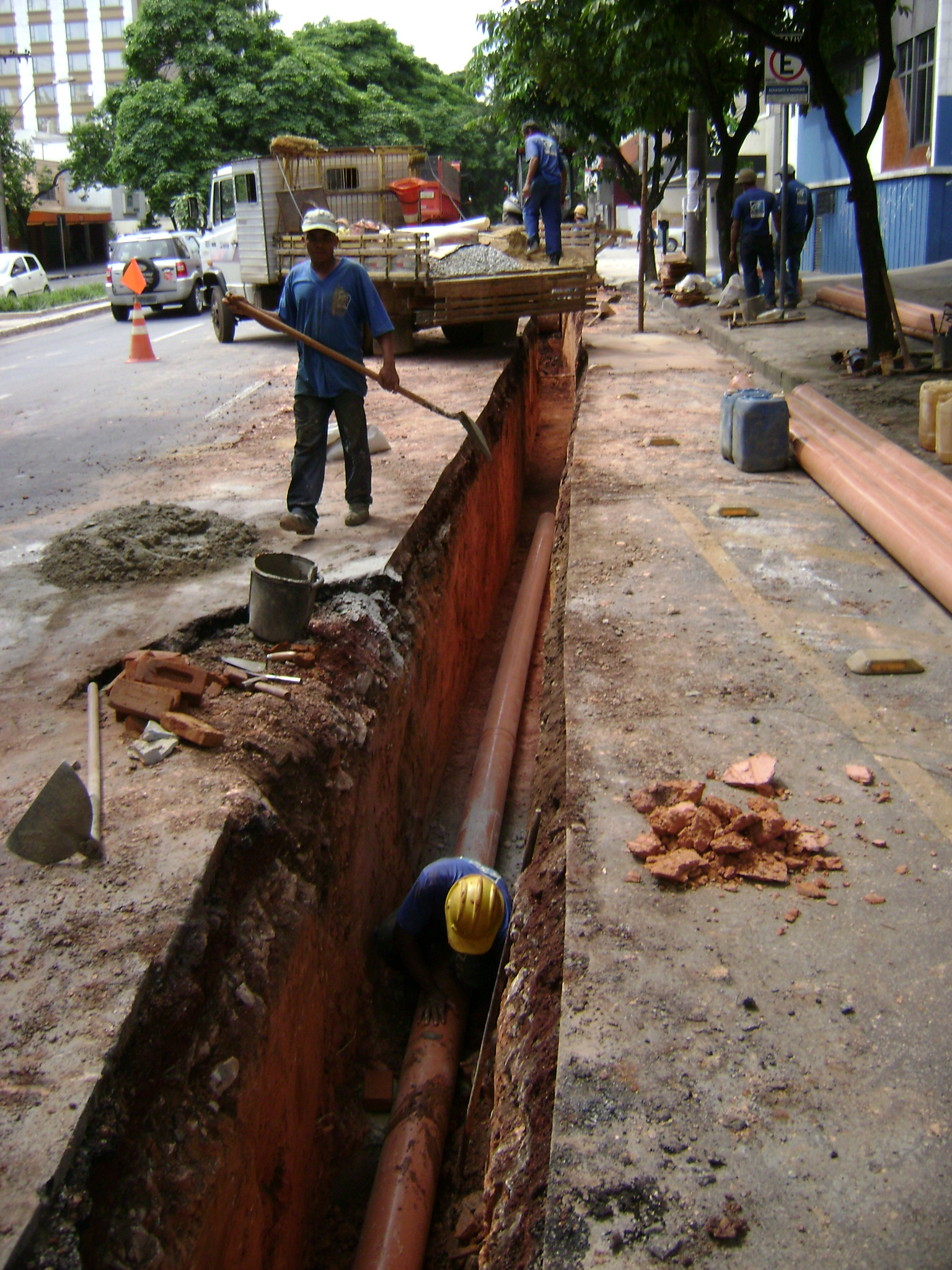
Pipe installation on a street in Belo Horizonte, Brazil

- Plumbing
- Tap water
- Irrigation
- Pipelines transporting gas or liquid over long distances
- Compressed air systems
- Casing for concrete pilings used in construction projects
- High-temperature or high-pressure manufacturing processes
- The petroleum industry:
  - Oil well casing
  - Oil refinery equipment
- Delivery of fluids, either gaseous or liquid, in a process plant from one point to another point in the process
- Delivery of bulk solids, in a food or process plant from one point to another point in the process
- The construction of high pressure storage vessels (large pressure vessels are constructed from plate, not pipe owing to their wall thickness and size).

Additionally, pipes are used for many purposes that do not involve conveying fluid. Handrails, scaffolding, and support structures are often constructed from structural pipes, especially in an industrial environment.

== History ==
The first known use of pipes was in Ancient Egypt. The Pyramid of Sahure, completed around the 25th century BC, included a temple with an elaborate drainage system including more than 380 m (1,247 ft) of copper piping.

During the Napoleonic Wars Birmingham gunmakers tried to use rolling mills to make iron musket barrels. One of them, Henry Osborne, developed a relatively effective process in 1817 with which he started to make iron gas tubes ca. 1820, selling some to gas lighting pioneer Samuel Clegg.

When steel pipes were introduced in 19th century, they initially were riveted, and later clamped with H-shaped bars (even though methods for making weldless steel tubes were known already in the 1870s), until by the early 1930s these methods were replaced by welding, which is still widely used today.

== Manufacture ==
There are three processes for metallic pipe manufacture. Centrifugal casting of hot alloyed metal is one of the most prominent processes. Ductile iron pipes are generally manufactured in such a fashion.

Seamless pipe (SMLS) is formed by drawing a solid billet over a piercing rod to create the hollow shell in a process called rotary piercing. As the manufacturing process does not include any welding, seamless pipes are perceived to be stronger and more reliable. Historically, seamless pipe was regarded as withstanding pressure better than other types, and was often more available than welded pipe.

Advances since the 1970s, in materials, process control, and non-destructive testing, allow correctly specified welded pipe to replace seamless in many applications. Welded pipe is formed by rolling plate and welding the seam (usually by Electric resistance welding ("ERW"), or Electric Fusion Welding ("EFW")). The weld flash can be removed from both inner and outer surfaces using a scarfing blade. The weld zone can also be heat-treated to make the seam less visible. Welded pipe often has tighter dimensional tolerances than the seamless type, and can be cheaper to manufacture.

There are a number of processes that may be used to produce ERW pipes. Each of these processes leads to coalescence or merging of steel components into pipes. Electric current is passed through the surfaces that have to be welded together; as the components being welded together resist the electric current, heat is generated which forms the weld. Pools of molten metal are formed where the two surfaces are connected as a strong electric current is passed through the metal; these pools of molten metal form the weld that binds the two abutted components.

ERW pipes are manufactured from the longitudinal welding of steel. The welding process for ERW pipes is continuous, as opposed to welding of distinct sections at intervals. ERW process uses steel coil as feedstock.

The High Frequency Induction Technology (HFI) welding process is used for manufacturing ERW pipes. In this process, the current to weld the pipe is applied by means of an induction coil around the tube. HFI is generally considered to be technically superior to "ordinary" ERW when manufacturing pipes for critical applications, such as for usage in the energy sector, in addition to other uses in line pipe applications, as well as for casing and tubing.

Large-diameter pipe (25 centimetres (10 in) or greater) may be ERW, EFW, or Submerged Arc Welded ("SAW") pipe. There are two technologies that can be used to manufacture steel pipes of sizes larger than the steel pipes that can be produced by seamless and ERW processes. The two types of pipes produced through these technologies are longitudinal-submerged arc-welded (LSAW) and spiral-submerged arc-welded (SSAW) pipes. LSAW are made by bending and welding wide steel plates and most commonly used in oil and gas industry applications. Due to their high cost, LSAW pipes are seldom used in lower value non-energy applications such as water pipelines. SSAW pipes are produced by spiral (helicoidal) welding of steel coil and have a cost advantage over LSAW pipes, as the process uses coils rather than steel plates. As such, in applications where spiral-weld is acceptable, SSAW pipes may be preferred over LSAW pipes. Both LSAW pipes and SSAW pipes compete against ERW pipes and seamless pipes in the diameter ranges of 16”-24”.

Tubing for flow, either metal or plastic, is generally extruded.

=== Traceability and positive material identification (PMI) ===
When the alloys for piping are forged, metallurgical tests are performed to determine material composition by % of each chemical element in the piping, and the results are recorded in a material test report, also known as a Mill Test Report (MTR). These tests can be used to prove that the alloy conforms to various specifications (e.g. 316 SS). The tests are stamped by the mill's QA/QC department and can be used to trace the material back to the mill by future users, such as piping and fitting manufacturers. Maintaining the traceability between the alloy material and associated MTR is an important quality assurance issue. QA often requires the heat number to be written on the pipe. Precautions must also be taken to prevent the introduction of counterfeit materials. As a backup to etching/labeling of the material identification on the pipe, positive material identification (PMI) is performed using a handheld device; the device scans the pipe material using an emitted electromagnetic wave (x-ray fluorescence/XRF) and receives a reply that is spectrographically analyzed.

== Sizes ==
Pipe sizes can be confusing because the terminology may relate to historical dimensions. For example, a half-inch iron pipe does not have any dimension that is a half inch. Initially, a half inch pipe did have an inner diameter of 1/2 inch (13 mm)—but it also had thick walls. As technology improved, thinner walls became possible, but the outside diameter stayed the same so it could mate with existing older pipe, increasing the inner diameter beyond half an inch. The history of copper pipe is similar. In the 1930s, the pipe was designated by its internal diameter and a 1/16-inch (1.6 mm) wall thickness. Consequently, a 1-inch (25 mm) copper pipe had a 1 1/8-inch (28.58 mm) outside diameter. The outside diameter was the important dimension for mating with fittings. The wall thickness on modern copper is usually thinner than 1/16-inch (1.6 mm), so the internal diameter is only "nominal" rather than a controlling dimension. Newer pipe technologies sometimes adopted a sizing system as its own. PVC pipe uses the Nominal Pipe Size.

Pipe sizes are specified by a number of national and international standards, including API 5L, ANSI/ASME B36.10M and B36.19M in the US, BS 1600 and BS EN 10255 in the United Kingdom and Europe.

There are two common methods for designating pipe outside diameter (OD). The North American method is called Nominal Pipe Size (NPS) and is based on inches (also frequently referred to as NB ("Nominal Bore")). The European version is called DN ("Diametre Nominal" / "Nominal Diameter") and is based on millimetres. Designating the outside diameter allows pipes of the same size to be fit together no matter what the wall thickness.

- For pipe sizes less than NPS 14 inch (DN 350), both methods give a nominal value for the OD that is rounded off and is not the same as the actual OD. For example, NPS 2 inch and DN 50 are the same pipe, but the actual OD is 2.375 inches or 60.33 millimetres. The only way to obtain the actual OD is to look it up in a reference table.
- For pipe sizes of NPS 14 inch (DN 350) and greater the NPS size is the actual diameter in inches and the DN size is equal to NPS times 25 (not 25.4) rounded to a convenient multiple of 50. For example, NPS 14 has an OD of 14 inches or 355.60 millimetres, and is equivalent to DN 350.

Since the outside diameter is fixed for a given pipe size, the inside diameter will vary depending on the wall thickness of the pipe. For example, 2" Schedule 80 pipe has thicker walls and therefore a smaller inside diameter than 2" Schedule 40 pipe. The inside diameter is also important when determining the internal volume of a pipe.

Steel pipe has been produced for about 150 years. The pipe sizes that are in use today in PVC and galvanized were originally designed years ago for steel pipe. The number system, like Sch 40, 80, 160, were set long ago and seem a little odd. For example, Sch 20 pipe is even thinner than Sch 40, but same OD. And while these pipes are based on old steel pipe sizes, there is other pipe, like cpvc for heated water, that uses pipe sizes, inside and out, based on old copper pipe size standards instead of steel.

Many different standards exist for pipe sizes, and their prevalence varies depending on industry and geographical area. The pipe size designation generally includes two numbers; one that indicates the outside (OD) or nominal diameter, and the other that indicates the wall thickness. In the early twentieth century, American pipe was sized by inside diameter. This practice was abandoned to improve compatibility with pipe fittings that must usually fit the OD of the pipe, but it has had a lasting impact on modern standards around the world.

In North America and the UK, pressure piping is usually specified by Nominal Pipe Size (NPS) and schedule (SCH). Pipe sizes are documented by a number of standards, including API 5L, ANSI/ASME B36.10M (Table 1) in the US, and BS 1600 and BS 1387 in the United Kingdom. Typically the pipe wall thickness is the controlled variable, and the Inside Diameter (I.D.) is allowed to vary. The pipe wall thickness has a variance of approximately 12.5 percent.

In the rest of Europe pressure piping uses the same pipe IDs and wall thicknesses as Nominal Pipe Size, but labels them with a metric Diameter Nominal (DN) instead of the imperial NPS. For NPS larger than 14, the DN is equal to the NPS multiplied by 25. (Not 25.4) This is documented by EN 10255 (formerly DIN 2448 and BS 1387) and ISO 65:1981, and it is often called DIN or ISO pipe.

Japan has its own set of standard pipe sizes, often called JIS pipe.

The Iron Pipe Size (IPS) is an older system still used by some manufacturers and legacy drawings and equipment. The IPS number is the same as the NPS number, but the schedules were limited to Standard Wall (STD), Extra Strong (XS), and Double Extra Strong (XXS). STD is identical to SCH 40 for NPS 1/8 to NPS 10, inclusive, and indicates .375" wall thickness for NPS 12 and larger. XS is identical to SCH 80 for NPS 1/8 to NPS 8, inclusive, and indicates .500" wall thickness for NPS 8 and larger. Different definitions exist for XXS, however it is never the same as SCH 160. XXS is in fact thicker than SCH 160 for NPS 1/8" to 6" inclusive, whereas SCH 160 is thicker than XXS for NPS 8" and larger.

Another old system is the Ductile Iron Pipe Size (DIPS), which generally has larger ODs than IPS.

Copper plumbing tube for residential plumbing follows an entirely different size system in America, often called Copper Tube Size (CTS); see domestic water system. Its nominal size is neither the inside nor outside diameter. Plastic tubing, such as PVC and CPVC, for plumbing applications also has different sizing standards.

Agricultural applications use PIP sizes, which stands for Plastic Irrigation Pipe. PIP comes in pressure ratings of 22 psi (150 kPa), 50 psi (340 kPa), 80 psi (550 kPa), 100 psi (690 kPa), and 125 psi (860 kPa) and is generally available in diameters of 6, 8, 10, 12, 15, 18, 21, and 24 inches (15, 20, 25, 30, 38, 46, 53, and 61 cm).

== Standards ==
The manufacture and installation of pressure piping is tightly regulated by the ASME "B31" code series such as B31.1 or B31.3 which have their basis in the ASME Boiler and Pressure Vessel Code (BPVC). This code has the force of law in Canada and the US. Europe and the rest of the world has an equivalent system of codes. Pressure piping is generally pipe that must carry pressures greater than 10 to 25 atmospheres, although definitions vary. To ensure safe operation of the system, the manufacture, storage, welding, testing, etc. of pressure piping must meet stringent quality standards.

Manufacturing standards for pipes commonly require a test of chemical composition and a series of mechanical strength tests for each heat of pipe. A heat of pipe is all forged from the same cast ingot, and therefore had the same chemical composition. Mechanical tests may be associated to a lot of pipe, which would be all from the same heat and have been through the same heat treatment processes. The manufacturer performs these tests and reports the composition in a mill traceability report and the mechanical tests in a material test report, both of which are referred to by the acronym MTR. Material with these associated test reports is called traceable. For critical applications, third party verification of these tests may be required; in this case an independent lab will produce a certified material test report(CMTR), and the material will be called certified.

Some widely used pipe standards or piping classes are:

- The API range – now ISO 3183. E.g.: API 5L Grade B – now ISO L245 where the number indicates yield strength in MPa
- ASME SA106 Grade B (Seamless carbon steel pipe for high temperature service)
- ASTM A312 (Seamless and welded austenitic stainless steel pipe)
- ASTM C76 (Concrete Pipe)
- ASTM D3033/3034 (PVC Pipe)
- ASTM D2239 (Polyethylene Pipe)
- ISO 14692 (Petroleum and natural gas industries. Glass-reinforced plastics (GRP) piping. Qualification and manufacture)
- ASTM A36 (Carbon steel pipe for structural or low pressure use)
- ASTM A795 (Steel pipe specifically for fire sprinkler systems)

API 5L was changed in the second half of 2008 to edition 44 from edition 43 to make it identical to ISO 3183. The change has created the requirement that sour service, ERW pipe, pass a hydrogen induced cracking (HIC) test per NACE TM0284 in order to be used for sour service.

- ACPA [American Concrete Pipe Association]
- AWWA [American Water Works Association]
- AWWA M45

== Installation ==
Gas pipe awaiting installation

Pipe installation is often more expensive than the material and a variety of specialized tools, techniques, and parts have been developed to assist this. Pipe is usually delivered to a customer or jobsite as either "sticks" or lengths of pipe (typically 20 feet (6.1 m), called single random length) or they are prefabricated with elbows, tees and valves into a prefabricated pipe spool [A pipe spool is a piece of pre-assembled pipe and fittings, usually prepared in a shop so that installation on the construction site can be more efficient.]. Typically, pipe smaller than 2 inches (5.1 cm) are not pre-fabricated. The pipe spools are usually tagged with a bar code and the ends are capped (plastic) for protection. The pipe and pipe spools are delivered to a warehouse on a large commercial/industrial job and they may be held indoors or in a gridded laydown yard. The pipe or pipe spool is retrieved, staged, rigged, and then lifted into place. On large process jobs the lift is made using cranes and hoist and other material lifts. They are typically temporarily supported in the steel structure using beam clamps, straps, and small hoists until the pipe supports are attached or otherwise secured.

An example of a tool used for installation for a small plumbing pipe (threaded ends) is the pipe wrench. Small pipe is typically not heavy and can be lifted into place by the installation craft laborer. However, during a plant outage or shutdown, the small (small bore) pipe may also be pre-fabricated to expedite installation during the outage. After the pipe is installed it will be tested for leaks. Before testing it may need to be cleaned by blowing air or steam or flushing with a liquid.

=== Pipe supports ===
Pipes are usually either supported from below or hung from above (but may also be supported from the side), using devices called pipe supports. Supports may be as simple as a pipe "shoe" which is akin to a half of an I-beam welded to the bottom of the pipe; they may be "hung" using a clevis, or with trapeze type of devices called pipe hangers. Pipe supports of any kind may incorporate springs, snubbers, dampers, or combinations of these devices to compensate for thermal expansion, or to provide vibration isolation, shock control, or reduced vibration excitation of the pipe due to earthquake motion. Some dampers are simply fluid dashpots, but other dampers may be active hydraulic devices that have sophisticated systems that act to dampen peak displacements due to externally imposed vibrations or mechanical shocks. The undesired motions may be process derived (such as in a fluidized bed reactor) or from a natural phenomenon such as an earthquake (design basis event or DBE).

Pipe hanger assembles are usually attached with pipe clamps. Possible exposure to high temperatures and heavy loads should be included when specifying which clamps are needed.

== Joining ==
Pipes are commonly joined by welding, using threaded pipe and fittings; sealing the connection with a pipe thread compound, Polytetrafluoroethylene (PTFE) Thread seal tape, oakum, or PTFE string, or by using a mechanical coupling. Process piping is usually joined by welding using a TIG or MIG process. The most common process pipe joint is the butt weld. The ends of pipe to be welded must have a certain weld preparation called an End Weld Prep (EWP) which is typically at an angle of 37.5 degrees to accommodate the filler weld metal. The most common pipe thread in North America is the National Pipe Thread (NPT) or the Dryseal (NPTF) version. Other pipe threads include the British Standard Pipe Thread (BSPT), the garden hose thread (GHT), and the fire hose coupling (NST).

Copper pipes are typically joined by soldering, brazing, compression fittings, flaring, or crimping. Plastic pipes may be joined by solvent welding, heat fusion, or elastomeric sealing.

If frequent disconnection will be required, gasketed pipe flanges or union fittings provide better reliability than threads. Some thin-walled pipes of ductile material, such as the smaller copper or flexible plastic water pipes found in homes for ice makers and humidifiers, for example, may be joined with compression fittings.

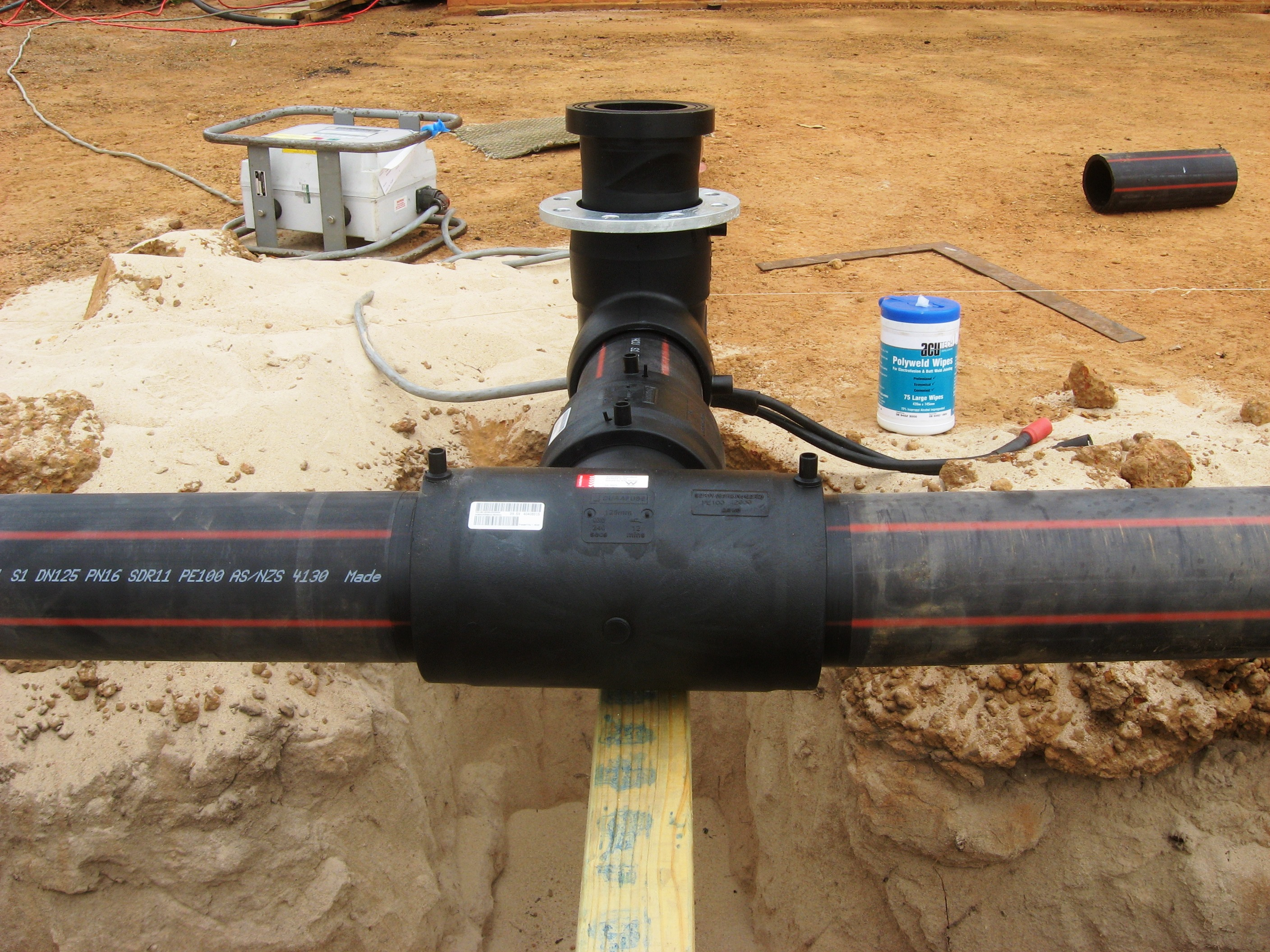
A HDPE ring main that has been joined with an Electrofusion Tee.

Underground pipe typically uses a "push-on" gasket style of pipe that compresses a gasket into a space formed between the two adjoining pieces. Push-on joints are available on most types of pipe. A pipe joint lubricant must be used in the assembly of the pipe. Under buried conditions, gasket-joint pipes allow for lateral movement due to soil shifting as well as expansion/contraction due to temperature differentials. Plastic MDPE and HDPE gas and water pipes are also often joined with Electrofusion fittings.

Large above ground pipe typically uses a flanged joint, which is generally available in ductile iron pipe and some others. It is a gasket style where the flanges of the adjoining pipes are bolted together, compressing the gasket into a space between the pipe.

Mechanical grooved couplings or Victaulic joints are also frequently used for frequent disassembly and assembly. Developed in the 1920s, these mechanical grooved couplings can operate up to 120 pounds per square inch (830 kPa) working pressures and available in materials to match the pipe grade. Another type of mechanical coupling is a flareless tube fitting (Major brands include Swagelok, Ham-Let, Parker); this type of compression fitting is typically used on small tubing under 2 inches (51 mm) in diameter.

When pipes join in chambers where other components are needed for the management of the network (such as valves or gauges), dismantling joints are generally used, in order to make mounting/dismounting easier.

=== Flare connections ===
Flare connections require that the end of a tubing section be spread outward in a bell shape using a flare tool. A flare nut then compresses this bell-shaped end onto a male fitting. Flare connections are a labor-intensive method of making connections, but are quite reliable over the course of many years.

==== Soldered connections ====
Solder fittings are smooth, and easily slip onto the end of a tubing section. Both the male and female ends of the pipe or pipe connectors are cleaned thoroughly then coated with flux to make sure there is no surface oxide and to ensure that the solder will bond properly with the base metal. The joint is then heated using a torch, and solder is melted into the connection. When the solder cools, it forms a very strong bond which can last for decades. Solder-connected rigid copper is the most popular choice for water supply lines in modern buildings. In situations where many connections must be made at once (such as plumbing of a new building), solder offers much quicker and much less expensive joinery than compression or flare fittings. The term sweating is sometimes used to describe the process of soldering pipes.

==== Compression connections ====
Compression fittings use a soft metal or thermoplastic ring (the compression ring or "ferrule") which is squeezed onto the pipe and into the fitting by a compression nut. The soft metal conforms to the surface of the tubing and the fitting, and creates a seal. Compression connections do not typically have the long life that sweat connections offer, but are advantageous in many cases because they are easy to make using basic tools. A disadvantage in compression connections is that they take longer to make than sweat, and sometimes require retightening over time to stop leaks.

==== Crimped or pressed connections ====
Crimped or pressed connections use special copper fittings which are permanently attached to rigid copper tubing with a powered crimper. The special fittings, manufactured with sealant already inside, slide over the tubing to be connected. Thousands of pounds-force per square inch of pressure are used to deform the fitting and compress the sealant against the inner copper tubing, creating a watertight seal. Advantages of this method are:

- A correctly crimped connection should last as long as the tubing.
- It takes less time to complete than other methods.
- It is cleaner in both appearance and the materials used to make the connection.
- No open flame is used during the connection process.

Disadvantages are:

- The fittings used are harder to find and cost significantly more than sweat type fittings.
- The fittings are not re-usable. If a design change is required or if a joint is found to be defective or improperly crimped, the already installed fittings must be cut out and discarded. In addition, the cutting required to remove the fitting often will leave insufficient tubing to install the new fitting. Therefore, couplers and additional tubing must be installed on either side of the replacement fitting. Whereas with a soldered fitting, a defective joint can just be re-soldered, or heated and turned if a minor change is required, or heated and removed without requiring any of the tubing to be cut away. This also allows more expensive fittings like valves to be re-used if they are otherwise in good to new condition, something not possible if the fitting is crimped on.
- The cost of the tooling is very expensive. As of 2016, a basic toolkit required to sweat solder all the copper pipes of a typical single family residence, including fuel and solder, can be purchased for approximately $200. By contrast, the minimum cost of a basic powered crimping tool starts at around $1800, and can be as high as $4000 for the better brands with a complete set of crimping dies.

=== Fittings and valves ===
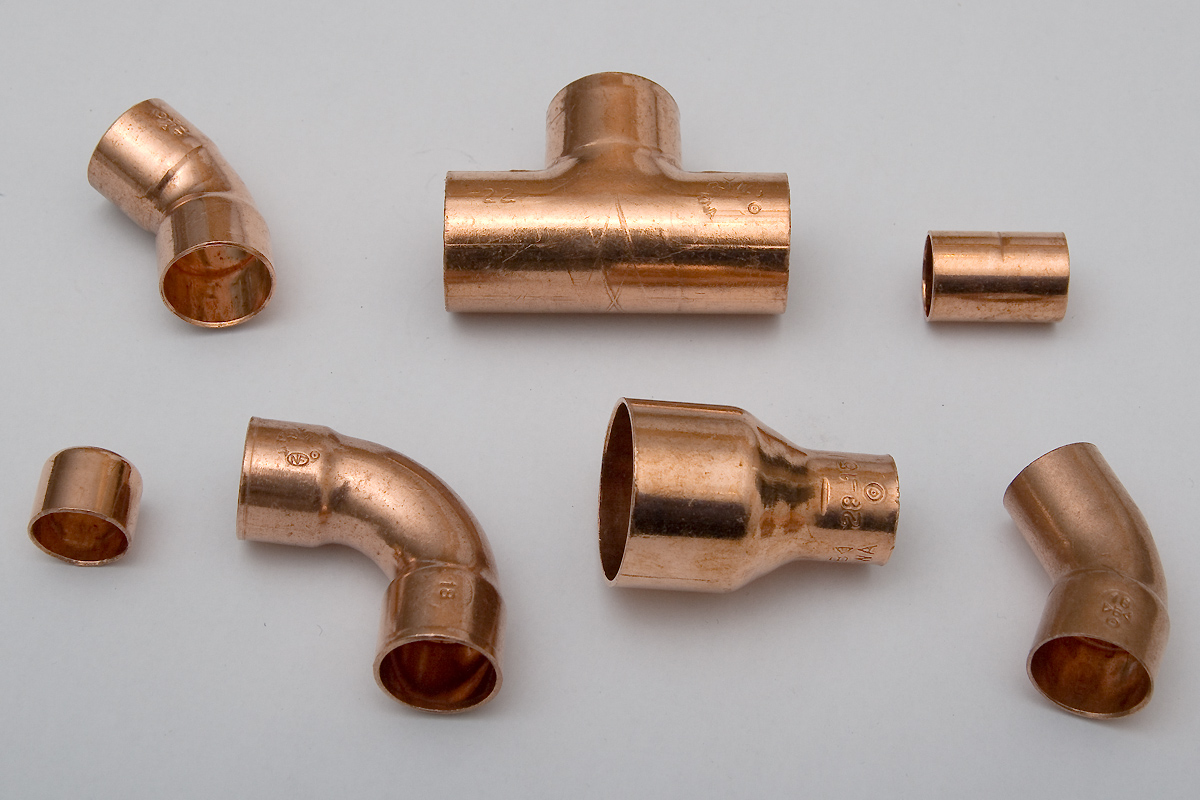
Copper pipe fittings

Fittings are also used to split or join a number of pipes together, and for other purposes. A broad variety of standardized pipe fittings are available; they are generally broken down into either a tee, an elbow, a branch, a reducer/enlarger, or a wye. Valves control fluid flow and regulate pressure. The piping and plumbing fittings and valves articles discuss them further.

== Cleaning ==
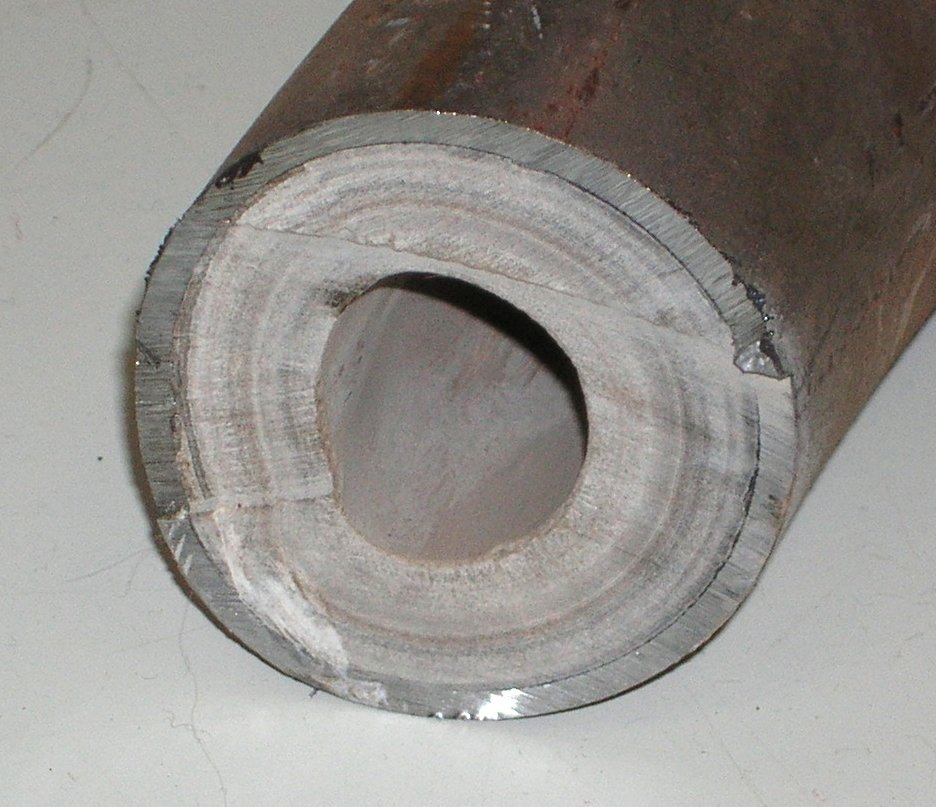
A pipe with limescale buildup, reducing the inner diameter considerably.

The inside of pipes can be cleaned with a tube cleaning process, if they are contaminated with debris or fouling. This depends on the process that the pipe will be used for and the cleanliness needed for the process. In some cases the pipes are cleaned using a displacement device formally known as a Pipeline Inspection Gauge or "pig"; alternately the pipes or tubes may be chemically flushed using specialized solutions that are pumped through. In some cases, where care has been taken in the manufacture, storage, and installation of pipe and tubing, the lines are blown clean with compressed air or nitrogen.

== Other uses ==
Pipe is widely used in the fabrication of handrails, guardrails, and railings.

== Pipe composition ==
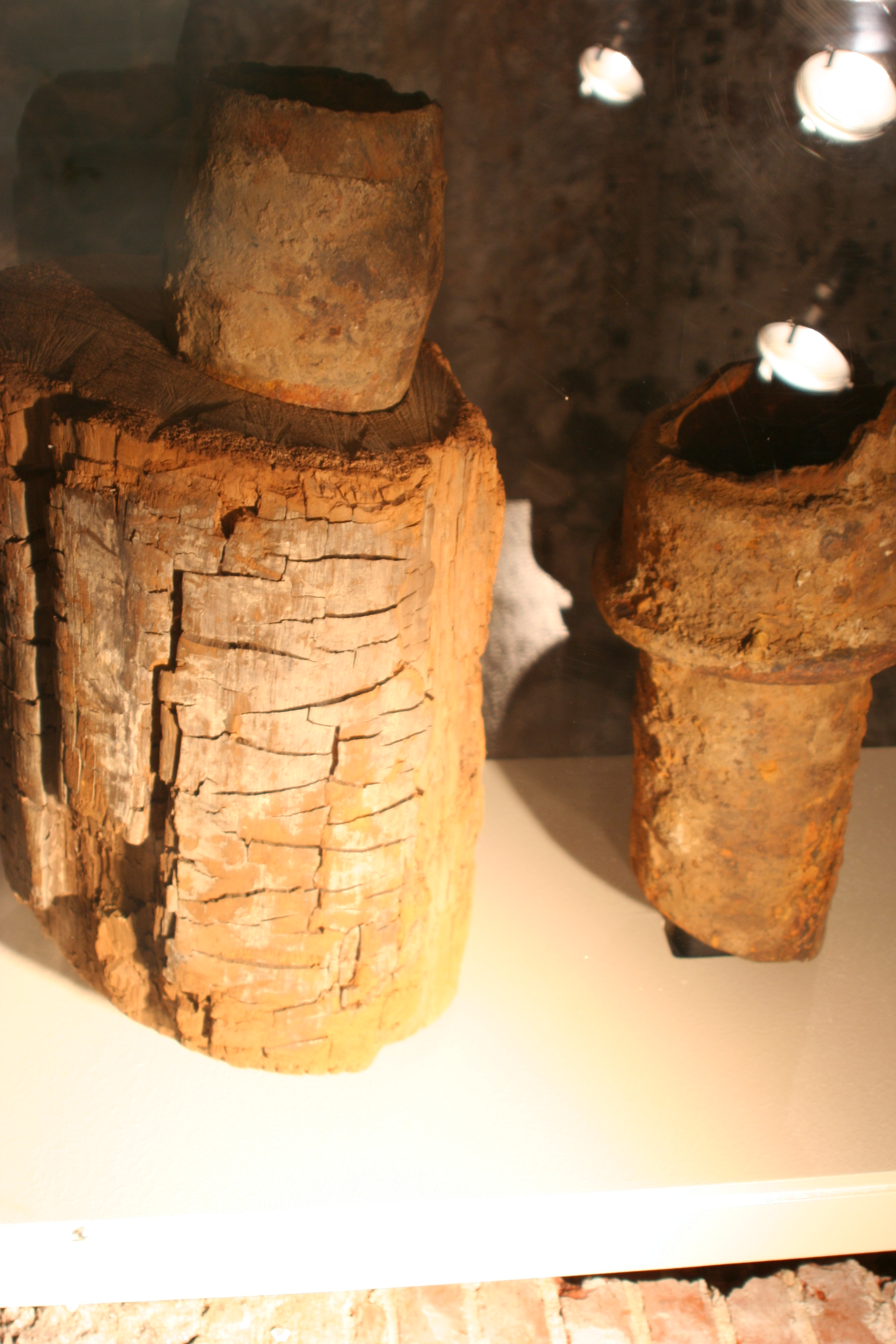
Historic water mains from Philadelphia included wooden pipes

The pipe industry can be subdivided according the materials from which pipes are fabricated. These are metal, thermoplastic, thermoset/composite, and concrete. Respective examples of the metals are copper and stainless steel. An illustrative thermoplastic is high-density polyethylene. A widely used thermoset/composite is PVC.

=== Metal ===
Typically metallic piping is made of steel or iron, such as unfinished, black (lacquer) steel, carbon steel, stainless steel, galvanized steel, brass, and ductile iron. Iron based piping is subject to corrosion if used within a highly oxygenated water stream. Aluminum pipe or tubing may be utilized where iron is incompatible with the service fluid or where weight is a concern; aluminum is also used for heat transfer tubing such as in refrigerant systems. Copper tubing is popular for domestic water (potable) plumbing systems; copper may be used where heat transfer is desirable (i.e. radiators or heat exchangers). Inconel, chrome moly, and titanium steel alloys are used in high temperature and pressure piping in process and power facilities. When specifying alloys for new processes, the known issues of creep and sensitization effect must be taken into account.

==== Lead ====
Lead piping is still found in old domestic and other water distribution systems, but is no longer permitted for new potable water piping installations due to its toxicity. Many building codes now require that lead piping in residential or institutional installations be replaced with non-toxic piping or that the tubes' interiors be treated with phosphoric acid. According to a senior researcher and lead expert with the Canadian Environmental Law Association, "[...] there is no safe level of lead [for human exposure]". In 1991 the US EPA issued the Lead and Copper Rule, a federal regulation which limits the concentration of lead and copper allowed in public drinking water, as well as the permissible amount of pipe corrosion occurring due to the water itself. In the US it is estimated that 6.5 million lead service lines (pipes that connect water mains to home plumbing) installed before the 1930s are still in use.

==== Steel ====
Steel pipe (or black iron pipe) was once the most popular choice for supply of water and flammable gases. Steel pipe is still used in many homes and businesses to convey natural gas or propane fuel, and is a popular choice in fire sprinkler systems due to its high heat resistance. In commercial buildings, steel pipe is used to convey heating or cooling water to heat exchangers, air handlers, variable air volume (VAV) devices, or other HVAC equipment.

Steel pipe is sometimes joined using threaded connections, where tapered threads (see National Pipe Thread) are cut into the end of the tubing segment, sealant is applied in the form of thread sealing compound or thread seal tape (also known as PTFE or Teflon tape), and it is then threaded into a corresponding threaded fitting using two pipe wrenches. Beyond domestic or light commercial settings, steel pipe is often joined by welding, or by use of mechanical couplings made by companies such as Victaulic or Anvil International (formerly Grinnell) that hold the pipe joint together via a groove pressed or cut (a rarely used older practice), into the ends of the pipes.

Other variations of steel pipe include various stainless steel and chrome alloys. In high-pressure situations these are usually joined by TIG welding.

In Canada, with respect to natural gas (NG) and propane (LP gas), black iron pipe (BIP) is commonly used to connect an appliance to the supply. It must however be marked (either painted yellow or yellow banding attached at certain intervals) and certain restrictions apply to which nominal pipe size (NPS) can be put through walls and buildings. With propane in particular, BIP can be run from an exterior tank (or cylinder) provided it is well protected from the weather, and an anode-type of protection from corrosion is in place when the pipe is to be installed underground.

==== Copper ====
Copper tubing is most often used for supply of hot and cold water, and as refrigerant line in HVAC systems. There are two basic types of copper tubing, soft copper and rigid copper. Copper tubing is joined using flare connection, compression connection, or solder. Copper offers a high level of resistance to corrosion, but is becoming very costly.

Soft (or ductile) copper tubing can be bent easily to travel around obstacles in the path of the tubing. While the work hardening of the drawing process used to size the tubing makes the copper hard/rigid, it is carefully annealed to make it soft again; it is therefore more expensive to produce than non-annealed, rigid copper tubing. It can be joined by any of the three methods used for rigid copper, and it is the only type of copper tubing suitable for flare connections. Soft copper is the most popular choice for refrigerant lines in split-system air conditioners and heat pumps.

Rigid copper is a popular choice for water lines. It is joined using a sweat, compression or crimped/pressed connection. Rigid copper, rigid due to the work hardening of the drawing process, cannot be bent and must use elbow fittings to go around corners or around obstacles. If heated and allowed to slowly cool, called annealing, then rigid copper will become soft and can be bent/formed without cracking.

==== Aluminium ====
Aluminium is sometimes used due to its low cost, resistance to corrosion and solvents, and its ductility. Aluminium tube is more desirable than steel for the conveyance of flammable solvents, since it cannot create sparks when manipulated. Aluminium tubing can be connected by flare or compression fittings, or it can be welded by the TIG or heliarc processes.

=== Glass ===
Tempered glass pipes are used for specialized applications, such as corrosive liquids, medical or laboratory wastes, or pharmaceutical manufacturing. Connections are generally made using specialized gasket or O-ring fittings.

=== Plastic ===
Plastic pipes used in manufacturing.

Plastic pipe fittings include PVC pipe fittings, PP / PPH pipe fitting mould, PE pipe and ABS pipe fitting. Plastic tubing is widely used for its light weight, chemical resistance, non-corrosive properties, and ease of making connections. Plastic materials include polyvinyl chloride (PVC), chlorinated polyvinyl chloride (CPVC), fibre reinforced plastic (FRP), reinforced polymer mortar (RPMP), polypropylene (PP), polyethylene (PE), cross-linked high-density polyethylene (PEX), polybutylene (PB), and acrylonitrile butadiene styrene (ABS), for example. In many countries, PVC pipes account for most pipe materials used in buried municipal applications for drinking water distribution and wastewater mains.

Pipe may be made from concrete or ceramic, usually for low-pressure applications such as gravity flow or drainage. Pipes for sewage are still predominantly made from concrete or vitrified clay. Reinforced concrete can be used for large-diameter concrete pipes. This pipe material can be used in many types of construction, and is often used in the gravity-flow transport of storm water. Usually such pipe will have a receiving bell or a stepped fitting, with various sealing methods applied at installation.

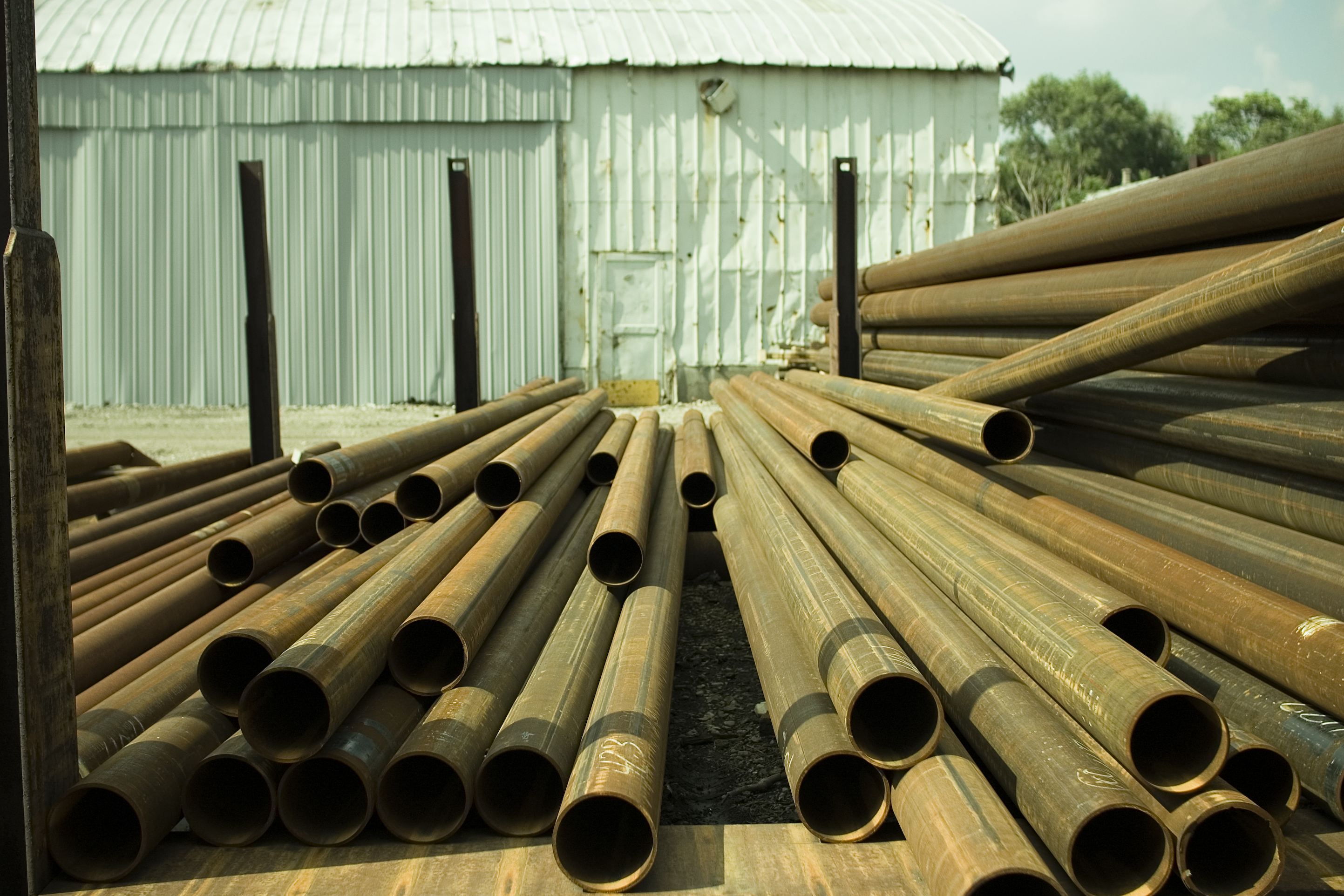
Carbon steel pipe in a storage yard

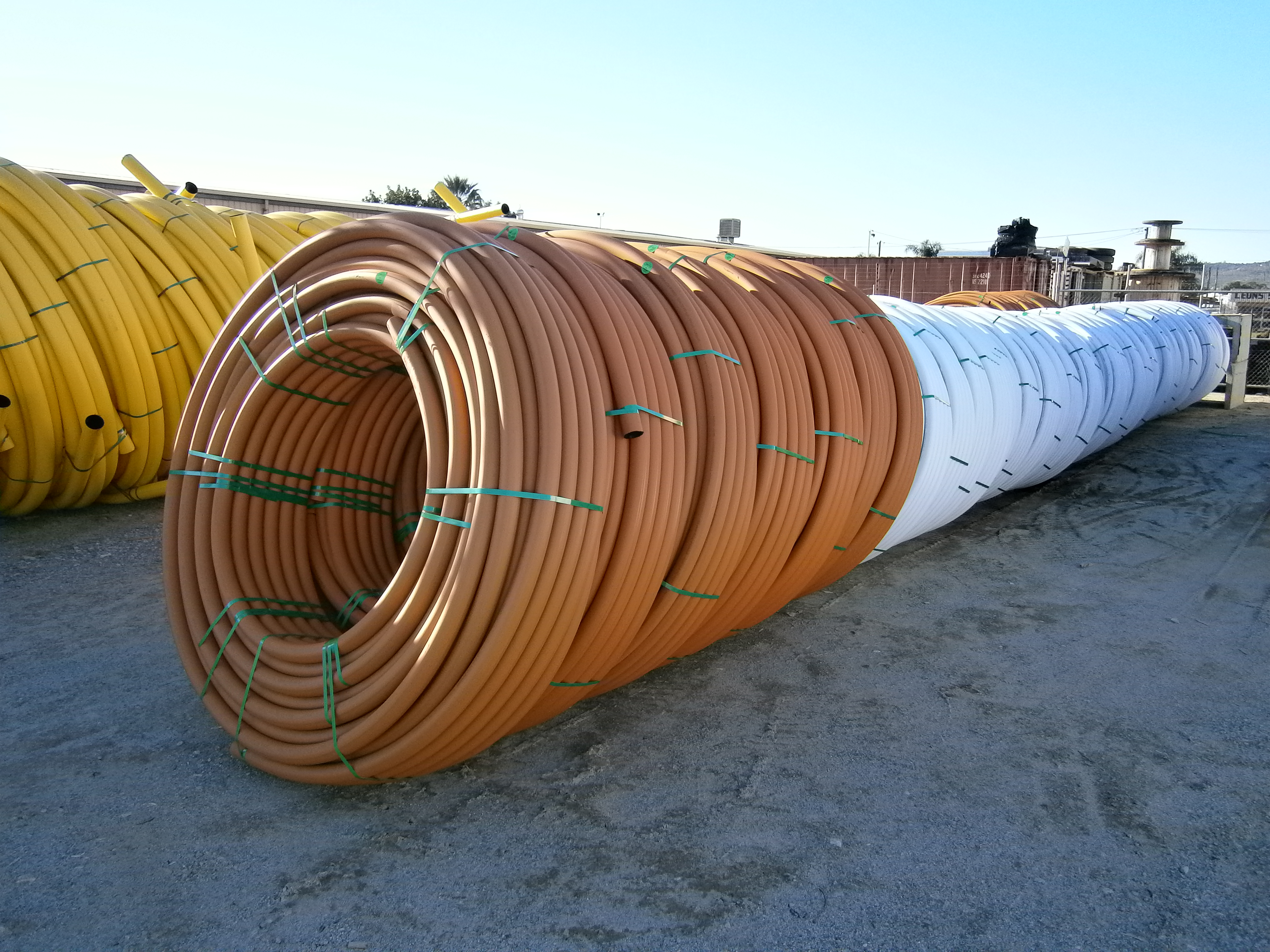
High-density polyethylene (HDPE) pipes

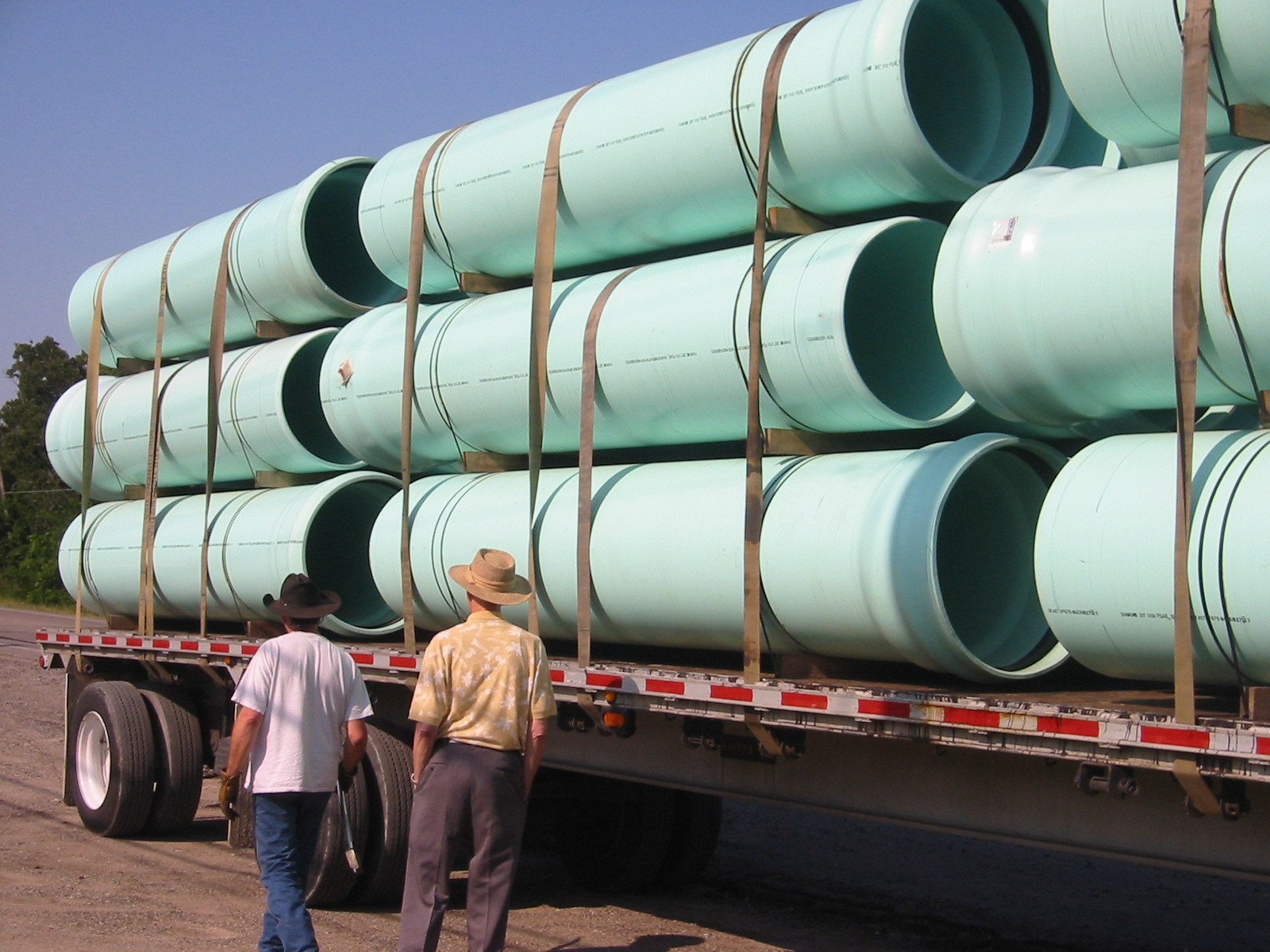
Plastic (PVC) pipes

== See also ==
- Cast iron pipe
- Copper tubing
- Double-walled pipe
- Ductile iron pipe
- Galvanized pipe
- Garden hose
- HDPE pipe
- Hollow structural section
- Hose
- Hydraulic pipes
- List of equations in fluid mechanics
- MS Pipe, MS Tube
- National Pipe Thread (NPT)
- Nominal Pipe Size (NPS)
- Panzergewinde
- Pipe and tube bender
- Pipeline transport
- Pipe support
- Piping
- Piping and plumbing fittings
- Plastic pressure pipe systems
- Plastic pipework
- Plumbing
- Reinforced thermoplastic pipes
- Sprayed in place pipe
- Trap (plumbing)
- Tube
- Tube beading
- Victaulic
- Water pipe
- Drain-waste-vent system
