= Compression fitting =

Plumbing fitting

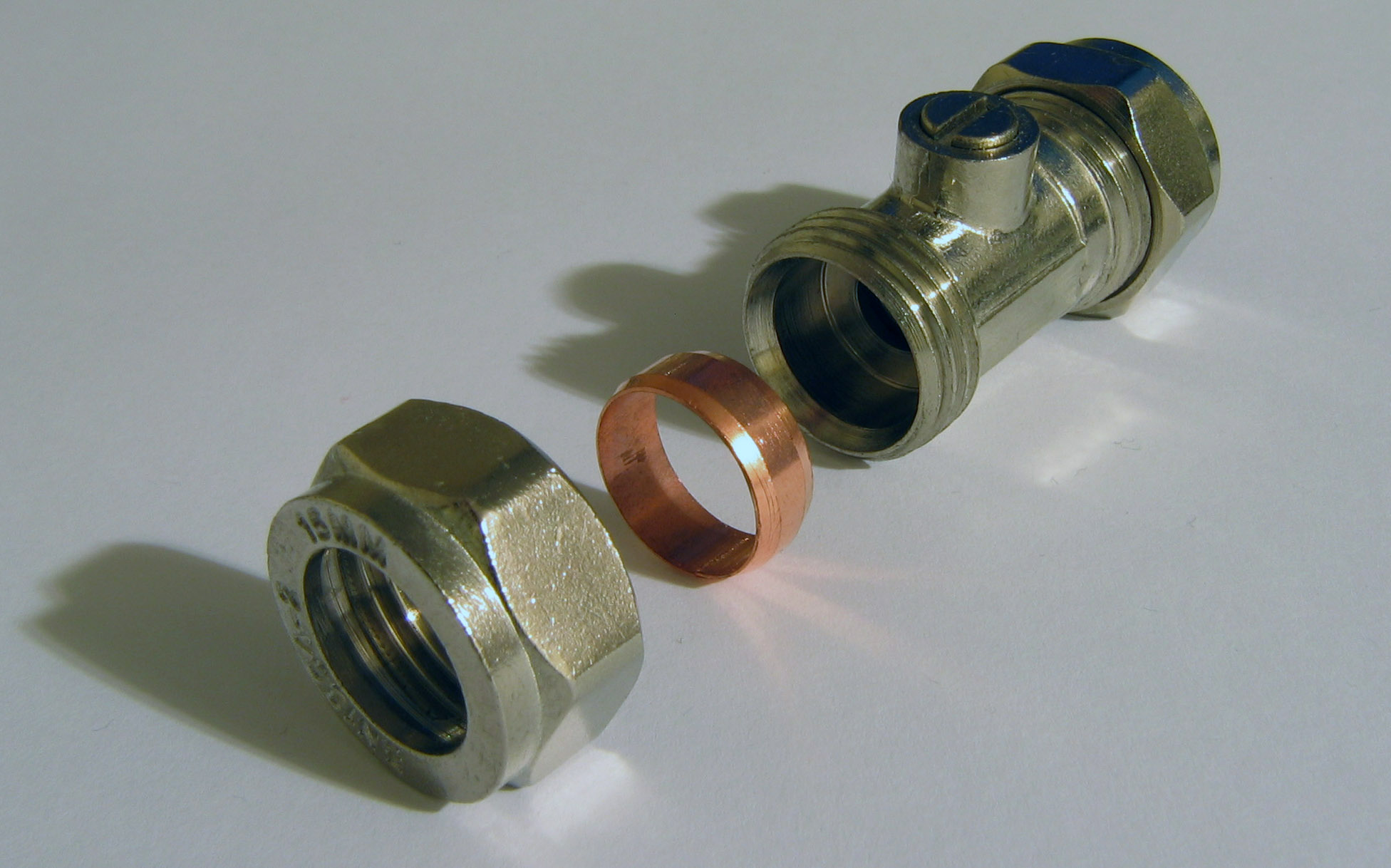
A compression fitting 15 mm isolating valve

A compression fitting is a fitting used in plumbing and electrical conduit systems to join two tubes or thin-walled pipes together. In instances where two pipes made of dissimilar materials are to be joined (most commonly PVC and copper), the fittings will be made of one or more compatible materials appropriate for the connection. Compression fittings for attaching tubing (piping) commonly have compression rings, called ferrules (American English) or olives (British English), in them, and are sometimes referred to as flareless fittings. There are also flare fittings that do not require ferrules/olives.

Compression fittings are used extensively in hydraulic, gas, and water systems to enable the connection of tubing to threaded components like valves and tools. Compression fittings are suited to a variety of applications, such as plumbing systems in confined spaces where copper pipe would be difficult to solder without creating a fire hazard, and extensively in hydraulic industrial applications. A major benefit is that the fittings allow easy disconnection and reconnection. There are now open source 3D-printable easy fittings that can be customized to connect pipes of any size up to 4.5MPa.

There are two types of compression fitting: standard (British type-A/non-manipulative) and flare fittings (British type-B/manipulative). Standard fittings require no modifications to the tubing. Flare fittings require modification of the tubing with a special tool. Standard fittings are typically used for water, hydraulic, and compressed air connections, whereas flare fittings are used for gas and high-pressure lines.

== Operation principle ==
In small sizes, the compression fitting is composed of an outer compression nut and an inner compression ring (ferrule) that is typically made of brass, copper, or steel. Ferrules vary in shape and material but are commonly ring-shaped with beveled edges. To work properly, the ferrule must be oriented correctly. Copper ferrules are normally barrel-shaped which means they cannot be fitted incorrectly. In other cases, particularly in hydraulic and high pressure applications, the ferrule must be fitted so that the longest sloping face of the ferrule faces away from the nut. Hydraulic-style ferrules have one end which is larger with a 45 degree chamfer which tapers away (from installation contact with the nut), and a small end with two internal biting edges.

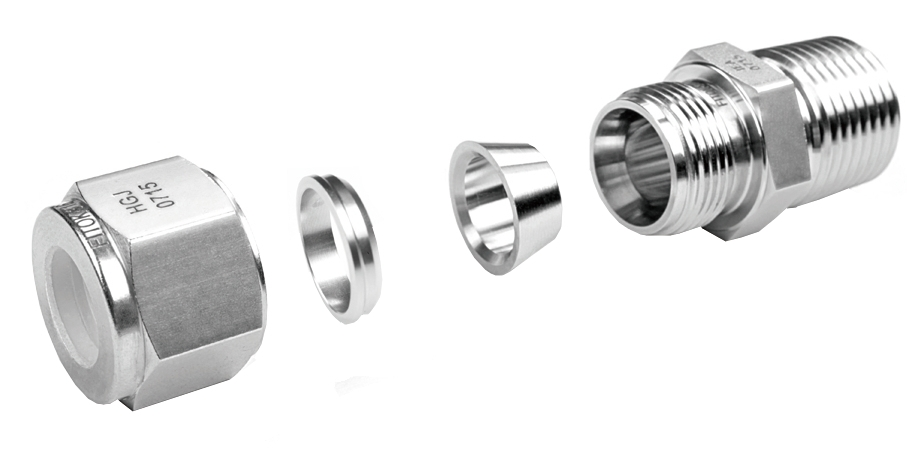
Fitok tube fittings

When the nut is tightened, the ferrule is compressed between the nut and the receiving fitting, causing both ends of the ferrule to be clamped around the pipe. The result is that the ferrule seals the space between the pipe, nut, and receiving fitting, forming a tight joint. The clamping support of the pipe help prevent movement of the pipe in the fitting, but it is only the taper at the receiving fitting itself that needs to seal completely. If it does seal (to both the pipe and the compression fitting), then no fluid can get to the nut threads or the taper to leak. As a result, some similar fittings can be made using a ferrules with only one taper where the seal prevents fluid from reaching the nut.

Larger sizes of compression fitting do not have a single nut to compress the ferrule but a flange with a ring of bolts that performs this task. The bolts must be tightened evenly.

Thread sealants such as joint compound (pipe dope or thread seal tape such as PTFE tape) are unnecessary on compression fitting threads, as it is not the thread that seals the joint but rather the compression of the ferrule between the nut and pipe. However, a small amount of plumber's grease or light oil applied to the threads will provide lubrication to help ensure a smooth, consistent tightening of the compression nut.

It is critical to avoid over-tightening the nut or else the integrity of the compression fitting will be compromised by the excessive force. If the nut is overtightened the ferrule will deform improperly causing the joint to fail. Indeed, overtightening is the most common cause of leaks in compression fittings. A good rule of thumb is to tighten the nut first by hand until it is too difficult to continue and then tighten the nut one half-turn more with the aid of a wrench; the actual amount varies with the size of the fitting, as a larger one requires less tightening. The fitting is then tested: if slight weeping is observed, the fitting is gradually tightened until the weeping stops.

The integrity of the compression fitting is determined by the ferrule, which is easily prone to damage. Thus care should be taken when handling and tightening the fitting, although if the ferrule is damaged it is easily replaced.

== Types of fittings ==
There are two types of compression fitting, standard (British type-A/non-manipulative) and flare fittings (British type-B/manipulative). Standard fittings require no modifications to the tubing. Flare fittings require modification of the tubing with a special tool. Standard fittings are typically used for water, hydraulic, and compressed air connections, whereas flare fittings are used for gas and high pressure lines.

A standard fitting can be installed using an ordinary wrench to tighten the surrounding nut. To remove it, a specialized puller is often used to slide the nut and ferrule off the tube. If the ferrule is difficult to remove it can be weakened with a cut, care being taken to not nick the pipe while cutting.

== Advantages ==
Compression fittings are popular because they do not require soldering, so they are comparatively quick and easy to use. They require no special tools or skills to operate. They work at higher pressures and with toxic gases. Compression fittings are especially useful in installations that may require occasional disassembly or partial removal for maintenance etc., since these connections can be broken and remade without affecting the integrity of the joint. They are also used in situations where a heat source, in particular a soldering torch, is prohibited, or where it is difficult to remove remains of water from inside the pipe which prevent the pipe heating up to allow soldering.

== Disadvantages ==
Compression fittings are not as robust as soldered fittings. Compression fittings are typically used in applications where the fitting will not be disturbed and not subjected to flexing or bending. A soldered joint is highly tolerant of flexing and bending (such as when pipes knock or shake from sudden pressure changes e.g. caused by water hammer). Compression fittings are much more sensitive to these types of dynamic stresses. They are also bulkier, and may be considered less aesthetically pleasing than a neatly soldered joint. Compression fittings work best when tightened once and not disturbed. Some compression connectors may never be reused, such as a ferrule ring type. It can never be reused once they have been compressed. This connector is directly placed over the pipe and the nut is tightened compressing the ferrule between the pipe and the body of the fitting. Compression of this ferrule also results in deformation of the copper tubing. If a compression type connection needs to be redone, more often than not the compressed copper/ferrule would need to be cut off and a new ferrule is to be used on a clean non-compressed piece of pipe end. This is to assure a leak proof sound connection.

== See also ==
- AN thread
- Cutting ring fitting
- Flare fitting
- JIC fitting
