= Threaded pipe =

Pipes with helical threads

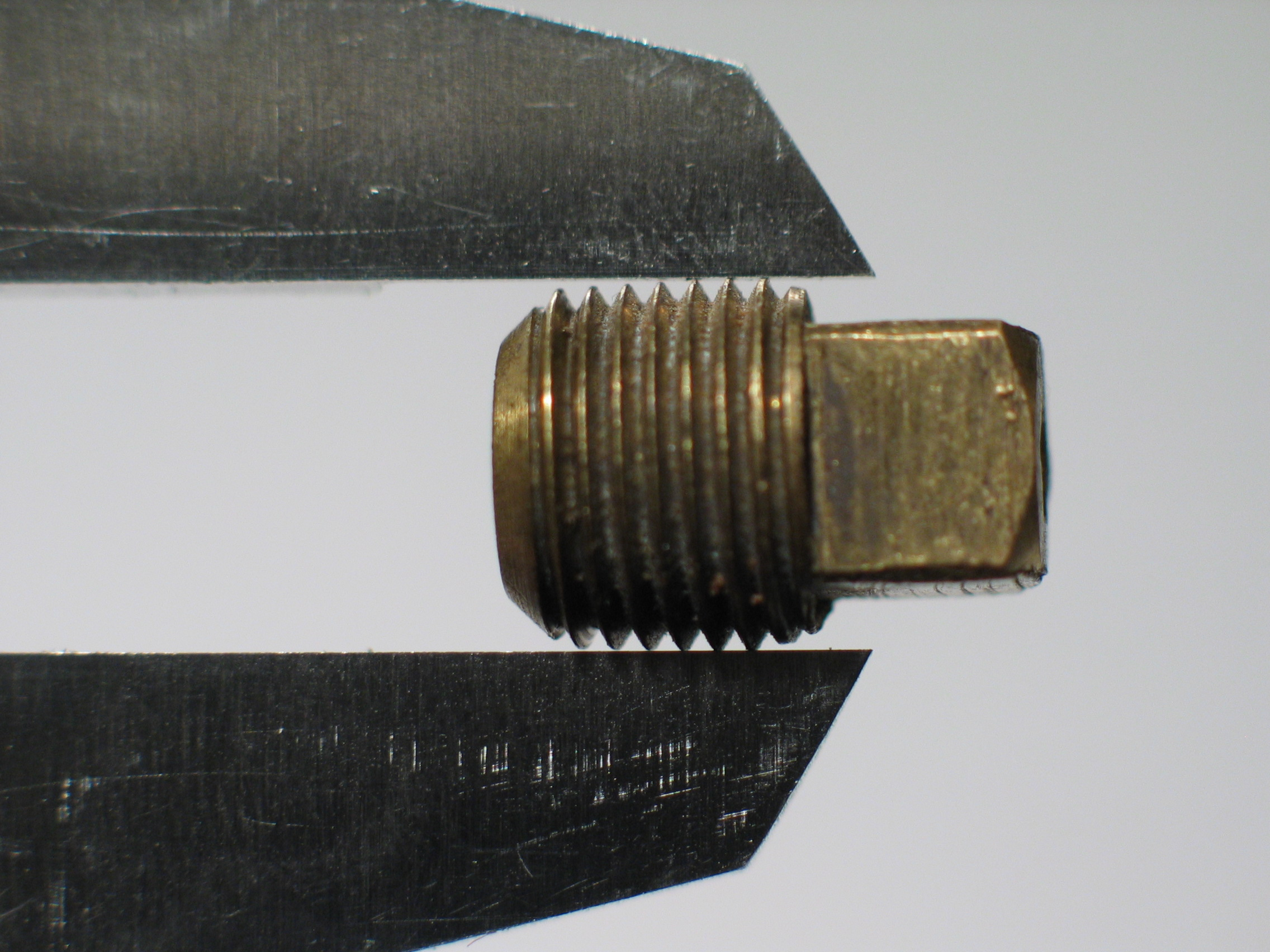
A threaded pipe plug; note that the threaded portion is tapered and so touches the calipers at only two points.

A threaded pipe is a pipe with screw-threaded ends for assembly.

== Tapered threads ==
The threaded pipes used in some plumbing installations for the delivery of gases or liquids under pressure have a tapered thread that is slightly conical (in contrast to the parallel sided cylindrical section commonly found on bolts and leadscrews). The seal provided by a threaded pipe joint depends upon multiple factors: the labyrinth seal created by the threads; a positive seal between the threads created by thread deformation when they are tightened to the proper torque; and sometimes on the presence of a sealing coating, such as thread seal tape or a liquid or paste pipe sealant such as pipe dope. Tapered thread joints typically do not include a gasket.

Especially precise threads are known as "dry fit" or "dry seal" and require no sealant for a gas-tight seal. Such threads are needed where the sealant would contaminate or react with the media inside the piping, e.g., oxygen service.

Tapered threaded fittings are sometimes used on plastic piping. Due to the wedging effect of the tapered thread, extreme care must be used to avoid overtightening the joint. The overstressed female fitting may split days, weeks, or even years after initial installation. Therefore, many municipal plumbing codes restrict the use of threaded plastic pipe fittings.

Both British standard and National pipe thread standards specify a thread taper of 1:16; the change in diameter is one sixteenth the distance travelled along the thread. The nominal diameter is achieved some small distance (the "gauge length") from the end of the pipe.

== Straight threads ==
Pipes may also be threaded with cylindrical threaded sections, in which case the threads do not themselves provide any sealing function other than some labyrinth seal effect, which may not be enough to satisfy either functional or code requirements. Instead, an O-ring seated between the shoulder of the male pipe section and an interior surface on the female, provides the seal.

== See also ==
- AN thread
- British Standard Pipe thread (BSP)
- Buttress thread
- Fire hose thread
- Garden hose thread
- National pipe thread (NPT)
- Nipple (plumbing)
- O-ring boss seal
- Panzergewinde (steel conduit thread)
- Piping
- Plumbing
- Screw thread
- Tap and die
- Thread angle
- United States Standard thread
