= FNPT =

FNPT can refer to:

- Flight & Navigation Procedures Trainer
- Female National Pipe Thread
