= Batch process =

Batch process may refer to:

- Batch processing (computing)
- Batch production (manufacturing)
