= O-ring boss seal =

Mechanical seal

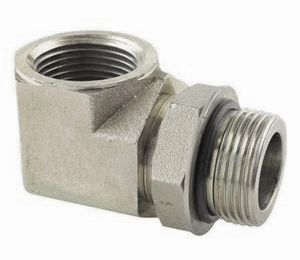
A 90-degree o-ring boss coupling

An o-ring boss seal is a technique for joining two fluid-carrying pipes, hoses, or tubing. In an o-ring boss (abbreviated ORB) system, a male-threaded part is inserted into a female-threaded part, providing a mechanical seal. This system differs from others in that a nut is tightened over an o-ring in a chamfered area, creating a fluid-tight seal.

== Application ==
This system is used frequently in hydraulics, although it has been applied to other systems including compressed air systems and vacuum pumps, such as many Robinair pumps, in which the intake tee has an o-ring boss seal on the bottom. The ORB system can be confused with other connection systems, such as NPT. While threads of different connectors sometimes fit (although often very inexactly), o-ring boss seal system connectors should never be used with any other type of connectors and vice versa, as leaks are likely. Under the high fluid pressures commonly seen in hydraulic systems, a leak or failure of the connection is quite dangerous and could lead to loss of life.

This system has the advantage of being able to be tightened mechanically before being sealed. Most threaded systems, such as NPT, have a seal provided by a taper in the thread, so it is difficult to orient both ends of the hose, pipe or tube so that it is not twisted. In the o-ring boss system, this problem is eliminated because the threads do not seal the connection and therefore can be rotated at least a full revolution before they are sealed while maintaining a proper mechanical connection. The orientation problem could also be solved with a suitable union.
