= National pipe thread =

U.S. national technical standards for threads on pipes and pipe fittings

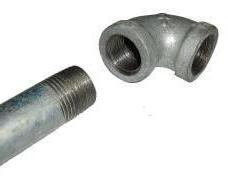
Threaded pipe and elbow. The pipe has a male NPT thread, while the elbow is female.

American National Standard Pipe Thread standards, often called national pipe thread standards for short, are United States national technical standards for screw threads used on threaded pipes and pipe fittings. They include both tapered and straight thread series for various purposes, including rigidity, pressure-tight sealing, or both. The types are named with a full name and an abbreviation, such as NPT, NPS, NPTF, or NPSC.

MIP is an abbreviation for male iron pipe, and FIP is an abbreviation for female iron pipe.

Outside North America, some US pipe thread sizes are widely used, as well as many British Standard Pipe threads and ISO 7–1, 7–2, 228–1, and 228-2 threads.

== Types ==
The various types are each named with an abbreviation and a full name, as follows:

Abbreviation	Shorthand expansion	Full name	Comment
NPT	National pipe taper	American National Standard Taper Pipe Thread	Tapered and needs thread sealant; for connections in nearly every type of service
NPS	National pipe straight	American National Standard Straight Pipe Thread	For rigidity; sealable with o-ring or gasket; sometimes male straight is mated with female tapered for low-pressure sealing
NPSC	National pipe straight – coupling	American National Standard Straight Pipe Thread for Couplings	For general couplings
NPSF	National pipe straight – fuel and oil	Dryseal USA (American) Standard Fuel Internal Straight Pipe Thread	Internal only, straight
NPSH	National pipe straight – hose	American National Standard Straight Pipe Thread for Hose Couplings	For hose couplings
NPSI	National pipe straight – intermediate	Dryseal USA (American) Standard Intermediate Internal Straight Pipe Thread	Similar to NPSF but slightly larger; internal only, straight
NPSL	National pipe straight – locknut	American National Standard Straight Pipe Thread for Loose-fitting Mechanical Joints with Locknuts	For use with locknuts
NPSM	National pipe straight – mechanical	American National Standard Straight Pipe Thread for Free-fitting Mechanical Joints	For various rigid mechanical uses
NPTF	National pipe taper – fuel and oil	Dryseal USA (American) Standard Taper Pipe Thread	For dryseal connections in nearly every type of service, especially fuel connections
NPTR	National pipe taper – railing	American National Standard Taper Pipe Thread for Railing Joints	For railings
PTF-SAE SHORT	Pipe taper, fuel, SAE, short	Dryseal SAE Short Taper Pipe Thread	Named after SAE International; similar to NPTF but one turn shorter

== Uses ==
Threaded pipes can provide an effective seal for pipes transporting liquids, gases, steam, and hydraulic fluid. These threads are now used in materials other than steel and brass, including PTFE, PVC, nylon, bronze, and cast iron.

The taper on NPT threads allows them to form a seal when torqued as the flanks of the threads compress against each other, as opposed to parallel/straight thread fittings or compression fittings in which the threads merely hold the pieces together and do not provide a seal. The various types of pipe threads are designed for use both with or without thread sealants, as particular applications demand. The sealants, where used, are typically thread seal tape thread sealant or a thread seal paste pipe dope (sometimes similar in composition to plumber's putty).

Because the thread body is tapered (0.75 in/ft or 62.5 mm/m), a larger diameter keeps compressing into a smaller diameter and finally forms a seal (no clearance remains between the crests and roots of the threads because of the taper). This means that NPT fittings should be burr-free and lubricated using a lubricant like lubricating paste or thread seal tape. The use of tape also helps to limit corrosion on the threads, which otherwise can make future disassembly nearly impossible.

Commonly used sizes are 1/8, 1/4, 3/8, 1/2, 3/4, 1, 1 1/4, 1 1/2, 2, 2 1/2, 3, 3 1/2, 4, 5, and 6 inch, as pipe and fittings by most US suppliers. Sizes smaller than 1/8 inch are occasionally used for compressed air, while sizes larger than 6 inches are often joined by other methods.

== Specifications ==
NPT is defined by ANSI/ASME standard B1.20.1.

The taper rate for all NPT threads is 1 inch of diameter in 16 inches of length (3/4 inch per foot or 62.5 millimeters per meter) measured by the change of diameter (of the pipe thread) over distance of thread. The half-angle (between the taper surface and the axis of the pipe) is arctan(1/32) ≈ 1.7899° ≈ 1° 47′.

The standard for Nominal Pipe Size (often abbreviated NPS, which should not be confused with the abbreviation NPS for the straight thread form standard) is loosely related to the inside diameter of Schedule 40 series of sizes. Because of the pipe wall thickness of Schedule pipe, the actual diameter of the NPT threads is larger than the Nominal Pipe Size diameter, and considerably so for small sizes. Pipe of a given size in a different Schedule than Schedule 40 provides a different wall thickness while maintaining the same outside diameter and thread profile as Schedule 40. Thus the inside diameter of a given size of Schedule pipe differs from the Nominal Pipe Size, while outside diameters for a given nominal Schedule size are the same between Schedules.

=== Thread form ===
National Pipe Thread series have the same 60° included angle as Sellers thread. On the other hand, for sealing capability, tapered (pressure-tight) threads have crest and root shapes that differ from Sellers. For example, the NPT has a crest width of 0.038 to 0.062 pitch, which is sharper than the 0.125 pitch of Sellers.

=== National pipe taper fuel (NPTF) ===
National Pipe Taper Fuel (NPTF, also called Dryseal American National Standard Taper Pipe Thread, defined by ASME B1.20.3) is designed to provide a more leak-free seal without the use of PTFE tape (often referred to by the popular brand name "Teflon") or another sealant compound. NPTF threads have the same basic shape but with crest and root heights adjusted for an interference fit, eliminating the spiral leakage path.

== Standard sizes ==
American Society of Mechanical Engineers National Pipe Thread Taper (NPT)
Nominal pipe size	Thread density	Thread pitch P		Hand-tight engagement			Effective thread			Overall length L_{4}	Actual outside diameter D		Tap drill	
Nominal pipe size	Thread density	Thread pitch P		Length L_{1}	Turns	Diameter E_{1}	Length L_{2}	Turns	Diameter E_{2}	Overall length L_{4}	Actual outside diameter D		Tap drill	
inch	inch^{−1}	inch	mm	inch		inch	inch		inch	inch	inch	mm	inch	mm
1/16	27	0.03703704	0.9407	0.1600	4.32	0.28118	0.2611	7.05	0.2875	0.3896	0.313	7.950		
1/8	27	0.03703704	0.9407	0.1615	4.36	0.37360	0.2639	7.13	0.38000	0.3924	0.405	10.287	0.339	8.6106
1/4	18	0.05555555	1.4111	0.2278	4.10	0.49163	0.4018	7.23	0.50250	0.5946	0.540	13.716	7/16	11.113
3/8	18	0.05555555	1.4111	0.2400	4.32	0.62701	0.4078	7.34	0.63750	0.6006	0.675	17.145	37/64	14.684
1/2	14	0.07142857	1.8143	0.3200	4.48	0.77843	0.5337	7.47	0.79178	0.7815	0.840	21.3360	23/32	18.2563
3/4	14	0.07142857	1.8143	0.3390	4.75	0.98887	0.5457	7.64	1.00178	0.7935	1.050	26.6700	59/64	23.4156
1	11 1/2	0.08695652	2.2087	0.4000	4.60	1.23863	0.6828	7.85	1.25631	0.9845	1.315	33.4010	1 5/32	29.3688
1 1/4	11 1/2	0.08695652	2.2087	0.4200	4.83	1.58338	0.7068	8.13	1.60131	1.0085	1.660	42.1640	1 1/2	38.1000
1 1/2	11 1/2	0.08695652	2.2087	0.4200	4.83	1.82234	0.7235	8.32	1.84131	1.0252	1.900	48.2600	1 47/64	44.0531
2	11 1/2	0.08695652	2.2087	0.4360	5.01	2.29627	0.7565	8.70	2.31630	1.0582	2.375	60.3250	2 7/32	56.3563
2 1/2	8	0.12500000	3.1750	0.6820	5.46	2.76216	1.1375	9.10	2.79063	1.5712	2.875	73.0250	2 5/8	66.6750
3	8	0.12500000	3.1750	0.7660	6.13	3.38850	1.2000	9.60	3.41563	1.6337	3.500	88.9000	3 1/4	82.5500
3 1/2	8	0.12500000	3.1750	0.8210	6.57	3.88881	1.2500	10.00	3.91563	1.6837	4.000	101.6000	3 3/4	95.2500
4	8	0.12500000	3.1750	0.8440	6.75	4.38713	1.3000	10.40	4.41563	1.7337	4.500	114.3000	4 1/4	107.9500
4 1/2	8	0.12500000	3.1750								5.000	127.0000	4 3/4	120.6500
5	8	0.12500000	3.1750	0.9370	7.50	5.44929	1.4063	11.25	5.47863	1.8400	5.563	141.3002	5 9/32	134.1438
6	8	0.12500000	3.1750	0.9580	7.66	6.50597	1.5125	12.10	6.54063	1.9462	6.625	168.2750	6 11/32	161.1313
8	8	0.12500000	3.1750	1.0630	8.50	8.50003	1.7125	13.70	8.54063	2.1462	8.625	219.0750		
10	8	0.12500000	3.1750	1.2100	9.68	10.62094	1.9250	15.40	10.66563	2.3587	10.750	273.0500		
12	8	0.12500000	3.1750	1.3600	10.88	12.61781	2.1250	17.00	12.66563	2.5587	12.750	323.8500		
14	8	0.12500000	3.1750	1.5620	12.50	13.87263	2.2500	18.00	13.91563	2.6837	14.000	355.6000		
16	8	0.12500000	3.1750	1.8120	14.50	15.87575	2.4500	19.60	15.91563	2.8837	16.000	406.4000		
18	8	0.12500000	3.1750	2.0000	16.00	17.87500	2.6500	21.20	17.91563	3.0837	18.000	457.2000		
20	8	0.12500000	3.1750	2.1250	17.00	19.87031	2.8500	22.80	19.91563	3.2837	20.000	508.0000		
24	8	0.12500000	3.1750	2.3750	19.00	23.86094	3.2500	26.00	23.91563	3.6837	24.000	609.6000		

Hand-tight and effective thread engagement lengths

== History ==
In 1864, William Sellers, then president of Franklin Institute, presented a standard for nuts, bolts, and screws. Out of this effort came the first United States Standard threads, including pipe threads.

== See also ==
- AN thread
- British Standard Pipe
- Fire hose thread
- Garden hose thread
- Gender of connectors and fasteners
- Panzergewinde
- Thread angle
- Threaded pipe

== Bibliography ==
- Oberg, Erik; Jones, Franklin D.; Horton, Holbrook L.; Ryffel, Henry H. (1996), Green, Robert E.; McCauley, Christopher J. (eds.), Machinery's Handbook (25th ed.), New York: Industrial Press, ISBN 978-0-8311-2575-2, OCLC 473691581.
