= Lot number =

ID number assigned to a particular batch of material

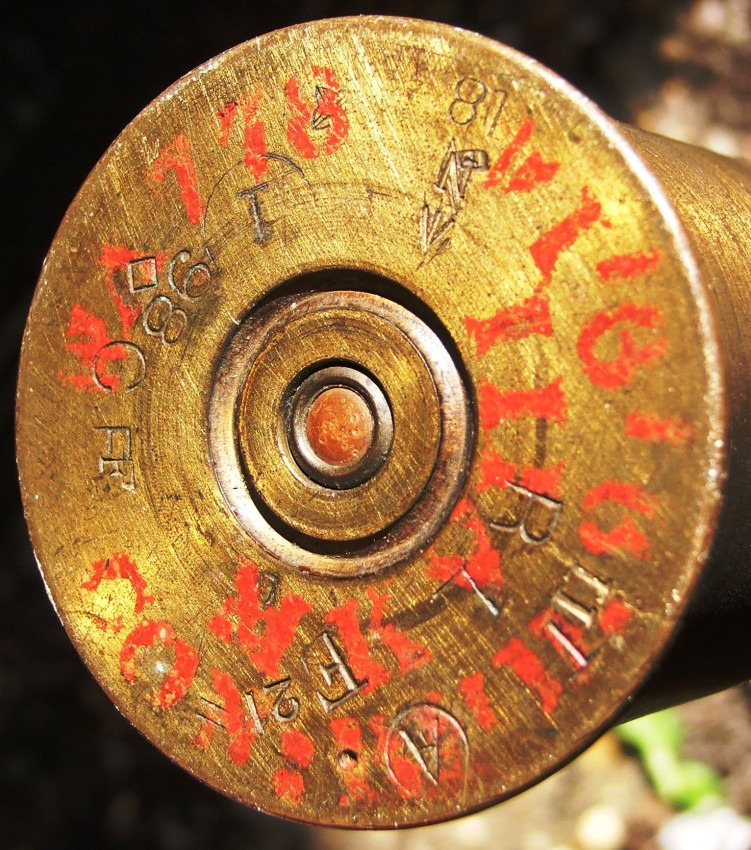
Lot number stamped on a British QF 3-pounder artillery shell.

A lot number is an identification number assigned to a particular quantity or lot of material from a single manufacturer. Lot numbers can typically be found on the outside of packaging. For cars, a lot number is combined with a serial number to form the Vehicle Identification Number.

The lot number enables tracing of the constituent parts or ingredients as well as labor and equipment records involved in the manufacturing of a product. This enables manufacturers and other entities to perform quality control checks, calculate expiration dates, and issue corrections or recall information to subsets of their production output. It also gives consumers an identifier that they can use in contacting the manufacturer and researching the production of goods received. For example to trace back the origin of fish or meat, in case of a public health problem.

Some lot numbers are generated with the use of date and time stamps to help identify a specific lot.

While there is no standard format for a lot number, often a date and lot code (DLC) will include the World Manufacturer Identifier or ISO manufacturer code, a date code indicating the week or perhaps the specific day the item was manufactured (not to be confused with the expiration date also stamped on some products), a company plant number or line number, and a batch number.

Some serial numbers have the same structure, with the addition of a unique count to distinguish between the items of a batch.

== See also ==
- Batch production
- Heat number
- Quality control
- Vehicle identification number
