= AN thread =

Fitting used to connect hoses and tubes

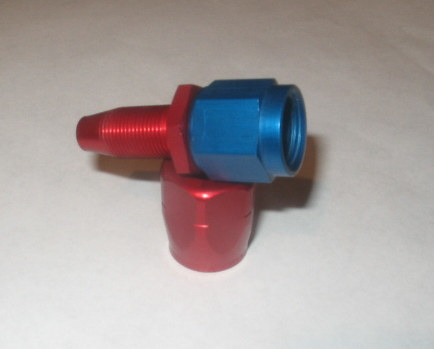
A 37° flare type end fitting for flexible hose

The AN thread (also A-N) is a particular type of fitting used to connect flexible hoses and rigid metal tubing that carry fluid. It is a US military-derived specification that dates back to World War II and stems from a joint standard agreed upon by the Army Air Corps and Navy, hence AN. The Air Corps-Navy involvement is also the origin of the red/blue color combination that was traditionally used in the anodized finishing process.

AN sizes range from -2 (dash two) to -32 in irregular steps, with each step equating to the OD (outside diameter) of the tubing in 1/16-inch increments. Therefore, a -8 AN size would be equal to 1/2-inch OD tube. However, this system does not specify the ID (inside diameter) of the tubing because the tube wall can vary in thickness. Each AN size also uses its own standard thread size.

AN fittings are a flare fitting, using 37° flared tubing to form a metal-to-metal seal. They are similar to other 37° flared fittings, such as JIC, which is their industrial variant. The two are interchangeable in theory, though this is typically not recommended due to the exacting specifications and demands of the aerospace industry. The differences between them relates to thread class and shape (how tight of a fit the threads are), and the metals used. Although similar, 37° AN and 45° SAE fittings and tooling are not interchangeable due to the different flare angles. Mixing them can cause leakage at the flare.

Note that AN threads are different for bolts and fittings. In bolts the number refers to the diameter of the bolt whereas in a fitting it refers to the OD of the tube and thereby have different threads. For example, AN6 bolt has a 3/8-24 thread whereas an -6 AN fitting has a 9/16-18 thread.

Originally parts were made compliant to the specification MIL-F-5509, but they are now controlled under SAE AS (Aerospace Standards) specifications AS4841 through AS4843 and AS4875.

Size comparison
AN size	-2	-3	-4	-5	-6	-8	-10	-12	-16	-20	-24	-28	-32
Tube OD (inches)	1/8	3/16	1/4	5/16	3/8	1/2	5/8	3/4	1	1 1/4	1 1/2	1 3/4	2
Nominal hose ID (inches)	1/8	3/16	1/4	5/16	3/8	1/2	5/8	3/4	1	1 1/4	1 1/2	1 3/4	2
Actual hose ID (inches, approximate)	1/16	1/8	3/16	1/4	5/16	7/16	1/2	5/8	7/8	1 1/8	1 3/8	1 5/8	1 3/4
SAE thread size	5/16-24	3/8-24	7/16-20	1/2-20	9/16-18	3/4-16	7/8-14	1 1/16-12	1 5/16-12	1 5/8-12	1 7/8-12	2 1/4-12	2 1/2-12
Pipe thread size (NPT)		1/8-27	1/4-18		3/8-18	1/2-14		3/4-14					

== See also ==
- Flare fitting
- National pipe thread
- O-ring boss seal
- Threaded pipe
