= JIC fitting =

Standard fitting for metal tubing

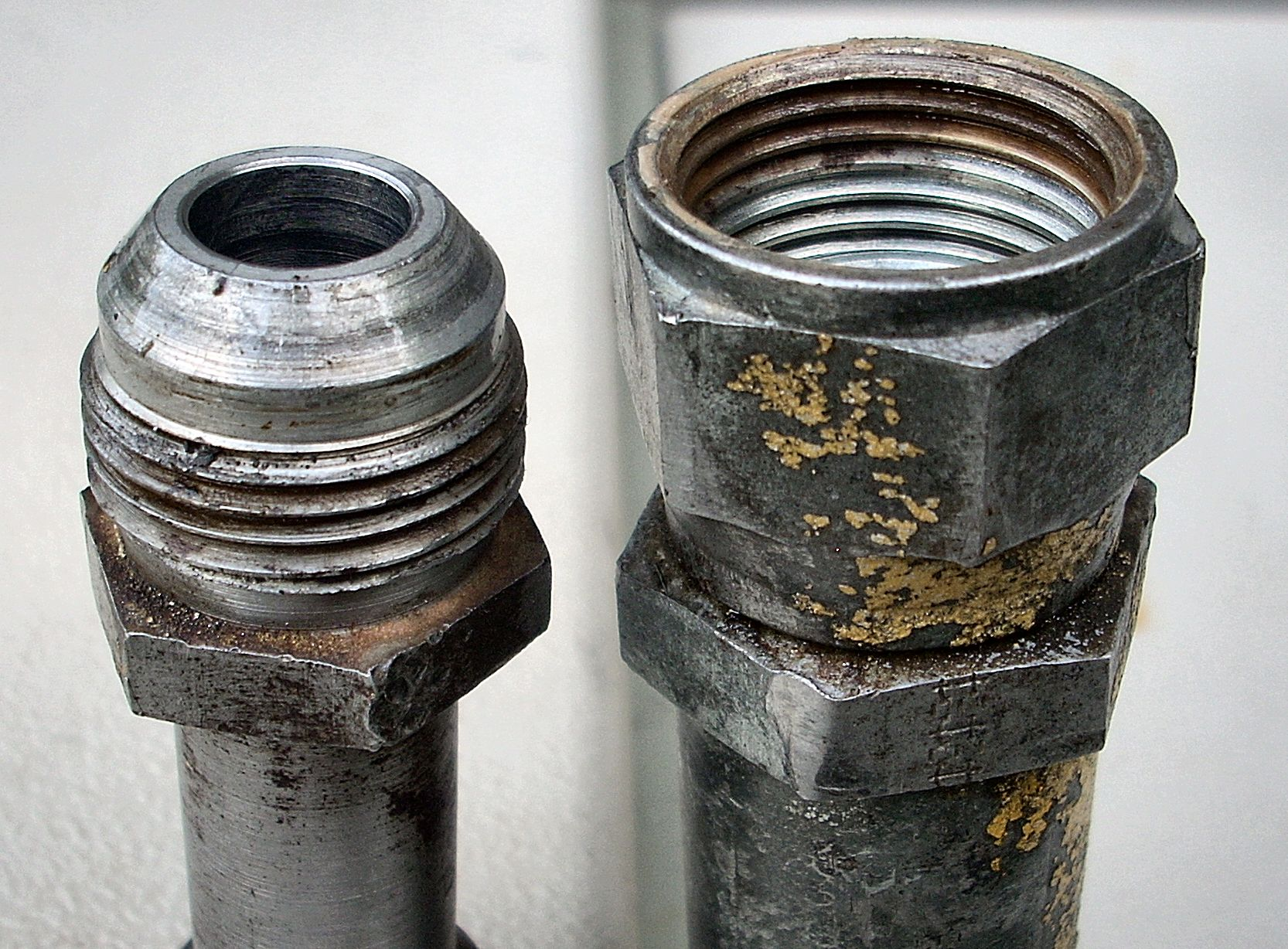
JIC hydraulic fitting from 1967 Ford backhoe. It was badly stuck, but shows what a JIC fitting looks like. The left is the male part, the right is female.

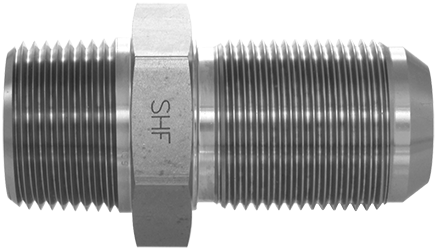
A JIC bulkhead adapter, which converts National Pipe Thread (NPT) on the left to JIC on the right. The angled seating surface is clearly visible on the far right.

JIC fittings, defined by the SAE J514 and MIL-DTL-18866 standards, are a type of flare fitting machined with a 37-degree flare seating surface. JIC (Joint Industry Council) fittings are widely used in fuel delivery and fluid power applications, especially where high pressure (up to 10,000 pounds per square inch (690 bar)) is involved. The SAE J514 standard replaces the MS16142 US military specification, although some tooling is still listed under MS16142. JIC fittings are dimensionally identical to AN (Army-Navy) fittings, but are produced to less exacting tolerances and are generally less costly. SAE 45-degree flare fittings are similar in appearance, but are not interchangeable, though dash sizes 2, 3, 4, 5, 8, and 10 share the same thread size. Some couplings may have dual machined seats for both 37-degree and 45-degree flare seats. Komatsu and JIS (Japanese Industrial Standard) fittings have flare ends similar to JIC fittings. Komatsu and JIS both use a 30-degree flare seating surface. The only difference is Komatsu uses millimeter thread sizes while JIS use a BSP (British Standard Pipe) thread. JIC fitting systems have three components that make a tubing assembly: fitting, flare nut, and sleeve. As with other flared connection systems, the seal is achieved through metal-to-metal contact between the finished surface of the fitting nose and the inside diameter of the flared tubing. The sleeve is used to evenly distribute the compressive forces of the flare nut to the flared end of the tube. Materials commonly used to fabricate JIC fittings include forged carbon steel, forged stainless steel, forged brass, machined brass, Monel and nickel-copper alloys.

JIC fittings are commonly used in the Fluid Power industry in a diagnostic and test-point setting. A three-way JIC coupling provides a port inline of circuit by which a user can connect a measurement or diagnostic device to take pressure readings and perform circuit and system diagnostics.

Specifications
Size Designation	Taper width, "A", inches	Thread width, "B", inches	Thread Spec. "C"	Shoulder width, "D" inches	Shoulder Diameter, "E", inches	Fitting Length, "F", inches	Bore Diameter, "H", inches	Tip Diameter, "I", inches
2	0.111	0.208	5/16” - 24 UNF	0.067	0.250	0.448	0.062	0.083
3	0.11	0.239	3/8” - 24 UNF	0.067	0.312	0.479	0.125	0.146
4	0.114	0.282	7/16” – 20 UNF	0.080	0.364	0.550	0.172	0.193
5	0.114	0.282	1/2” - 20 UNF	0.080	0.426	0.550	0.234	0.255
6	0.108	0.275	9/16" – 18 UNF	0.090	0.481	0.556	0.281	0.318
7	--	--	--	--	--	--	--	--
8	0.155	0.310	3/4” - 16 UNF	0.098	0.659	0.657	0.406	0.426
9	--	--	--	--	--	--	--	--
10	0.155	0.385	7/8” - 14 UNF	0.111	0.772	0.758	0.531	0.539
11	--	--	--	--	--	--	--	--
12	0.185	0.424	1-1/16” - 12 UN	0.130	0.943	0.943	0.609	0.664
13	--	--	--	--	--	--	--	--
14	0.186	0.450	1-3/16" – 12 UN	0.129	1.068	0.890	0.719	0.788
15	--	--	--	--	--	--	--	--
16	0.186	0.471	1-5/16" – 12 UN	0.129	1.193	0.911	0.844	0.913
17	--	--	--	--	--	--	--	--
18	--	--	--	--	--	--	--	--
19	--	--	--	--	--	--	--	--
20	--	--	1-5/8” – 12 UN	--	--	0.96	1.078	--
