= Cutting ring fitting =

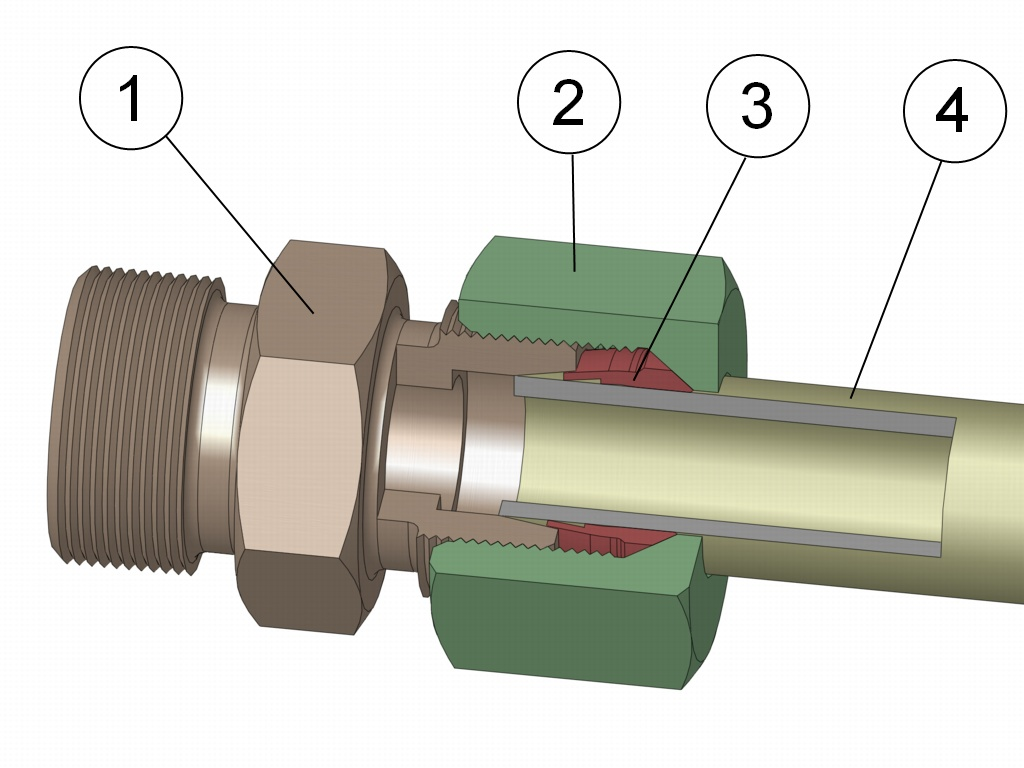
Cutting ring fitting before assembly

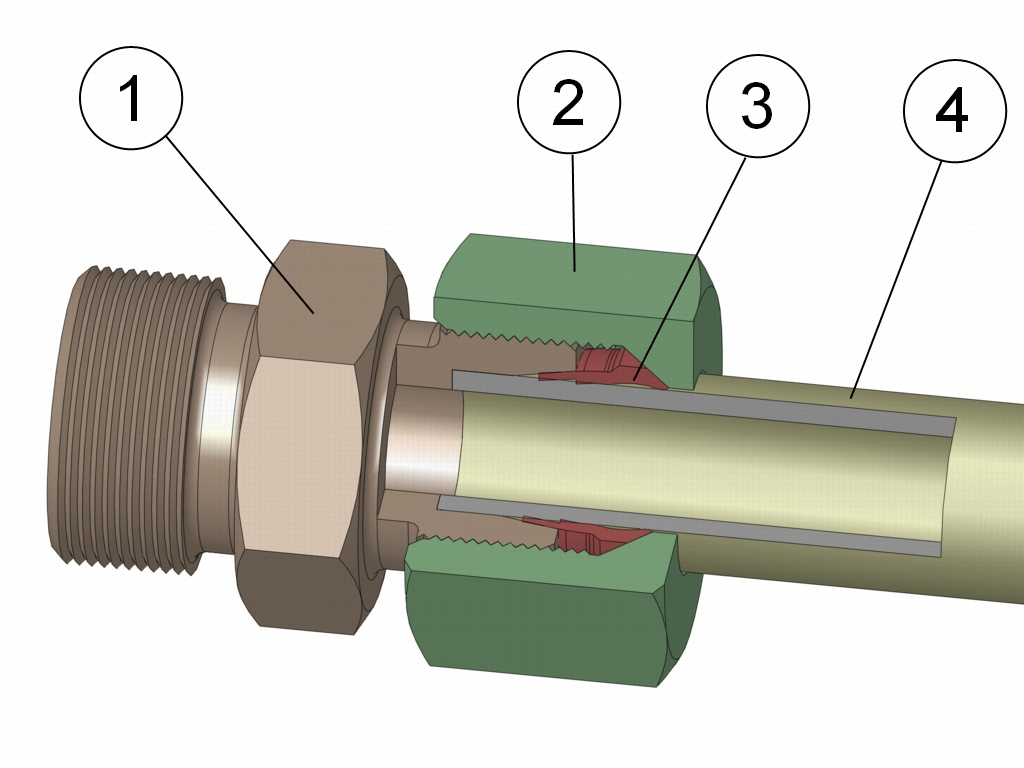
Cutting ring fitting assembled. 1-Body 2-Nut 3-Cutting ring 4-Tube

Cutting ring fittings are flareless fittings used for connections in fluid applications. They are used worldwide in hydraulic systems.

The cutting ring fitting consists of the body, the cutting ring and the nut. On assembly, the two cutting edges of the cutting ring carves into the outer surface of the tube hence ensuring the necessary holding power and sealing for high operating pressures. The tubes have usually metric dimensions.

The cutting ring fitting was invented by Ermeto in Germany in the early 1930s. Later Parker Hannifin acquired Ermeto and introduced the fittings to the US. Today they are standardized in ISO 8434.

== See also ==
- Compression fitting
- Piping and plumbing fitting
- Sweat fitting
