= Flare fitting =

Type of compression fitting used with metal tubing

Flare fittings are a type of compression fitting used with metal tubing, usually soft steel, ductile (soft) copper and aluminum, though other materials are also used. In a flare fitting the tube itself is "flared" i.e. expanded and deformed at the end. The flare is then pressed against the fitting it connects to and is secured by a close-fitting nut that ensures that no leakage occurs. Tube flaring is a type of forging operation, and is usually a cold working procedure. During assembly, a flare nut is used to secure the flared tubing's tapered end to the also tapered fitting, producing a pressure-resistant, leak-tight seal. Flared connections offer a high degree of long-term reliability and for this reason are often used in mission-critical and inaccessible locations.

The tool used to flare tubing consists of a die that grips the tube, and either a mandrel or rolling cone is forced into the end of the tube to form the flare by cold working.

The most common flare fitting standards in use today are the 45° SAE flare, the 37° JIC flare, and the 37° AN flare.

For high pressure, flare joints are made by doubling the tube wall material over itself before the bell end is formed. The double flare avoids stretching the cut end where a single flare may crack. Before the flaring step, the end of the tube is compressed axially causing the tube wall to yield radially outward forming a bubble. This bubble is then driven axially by a conical tool forming a double thickness flare just as for the single flare.

SAE 45° flare connections are commonly used in automotive applications, as well as for plumbing, refrigeration and air conditioning. SAE fittings for plumbing and refrigeration are typically made from brass. SAE and AN/JIC connections are incompatible due to the different flare angle.

JIC 37° flare connections are used in higher pressure hydraulic applications. JIC fittings are typically steel or stainless steel. JIC fittings are not permissible where AN connections are specified, due to differing quality standards.

AN 37° flare connections are typically specified for military and aerospace applications. Fittings can be made from a large variety of materials. The “AN” standard (for Army/Navy) has been replaced by other military and aerospace standards, though in practice these fittings are still referred to as AN.

Flared fittings are an alternative to solder-type joints that are mechanically separable and doesn't require an open flame. Copper tube used for propane, liquefied petroleum gas, or natural gas may use flared brass fittings of single 45°-flare type, according to NFPA 54/ANSI. Z223.1 National Fuel Gas Code. Many plumbing codes, towns, and water companies require copper tube used for water service to be type-L or type-K. All National Model Codes permit the use of flare fitting joints, however, the authority having jurisdiction (AHJ) should be consulted to determine acceptance for a specific application.

== Tool ==
The reaming tool deforms only the end of the pipe in a plastic way, thus increasing its inner and outer diameters to the required parameters. In industry, flattening involves rolling the pipe through rollers, which give it the appropriate shape. Flattening of pipes with hand tools is widely used during installation of water pipes, installation of air conditioners, installation of automobile and aviation brake and fuel systems.

The simplest flattener is a conical shaped template. It is inserted into the pipe, and hammered in the axial direction, which causes deformation to the required value. The main disadvantages of using such a tool are the inability to control the accuracy of the fit and the high probability of deformation of the walls where they should remain straight.

The most common is a tool design with a die and a cone, which is screwed through the handle until the edges are separated at the required angle.

A relatively new compact design is the reamer, used as an attachment to a drill. In this case, by friction, the pipe material is heated and gradually flattened to the shape of the nozzle.

== Pipe materials ==
In industrial settings, a wide range of metals are subjected to reaming. Copper and its alloys, mild steel, and in some cases small diameter stainless steel pipes are most commonly reamed with hand tools.

Copper is perfectly machinable, a quality tool successfully performs wall deformation, the surface remains smooth, the wall thickness is almost the same, and the material retains a homogeneous structure.

== See also ==
- Flare-nut wrench
- Pipe fitting
- Sweat fitting
