= Sprayed in place pipe =

Sprayed in place pipe (SIPP) technologies is a trench-less rehabilitation method used to repair existing pipelines, that involves a robotic lining system that develops and manufactures proprietary lining polymeric. SIPP is a jointless, seamless, pipe with in a pipe with the capability to rehabilitate pipes ranging in diameter of .1 to 2.8 meters. SIPP can be applied in water, sewer, gas, and chemical pipelines.
