= Heat number =

Unique identifier in steelmaking

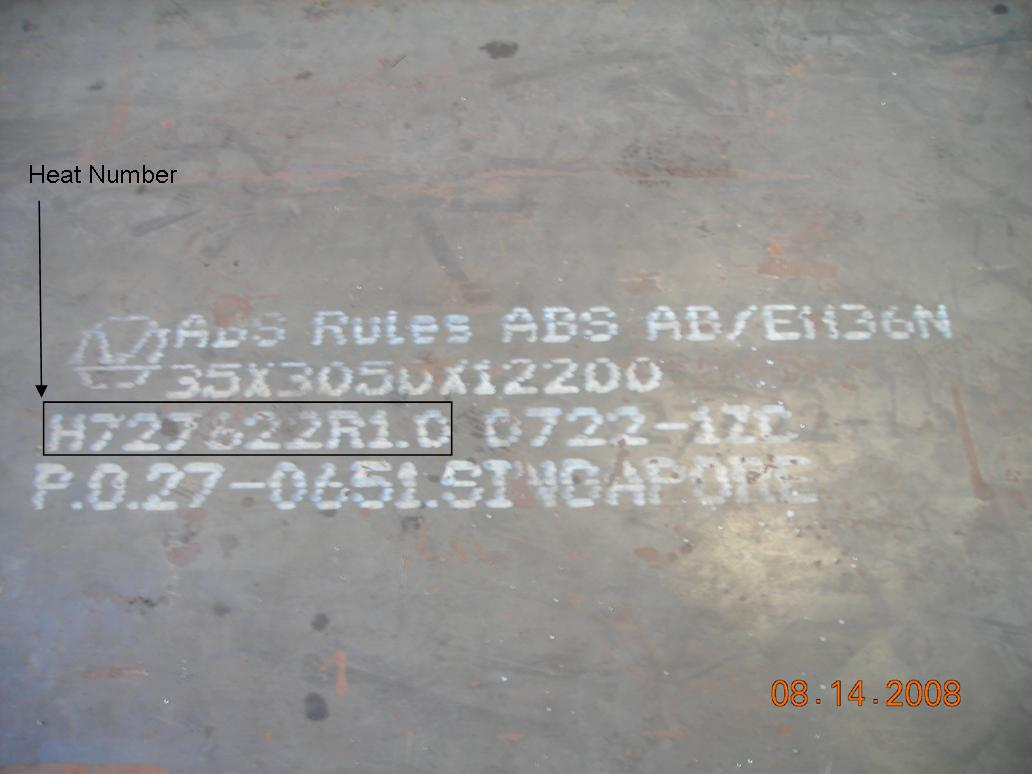
An example of a heat number on a plate.

A heat number is a unique identification coupon number that is stamped on a material plate after it is removed from the ladle and rolled at a steel mill. It serves as a traceable identifier that links the metal product to its specific batch or "heat," allowing access to detailed records about the material's composition, manufacturing process, and quality assurance.

Industry quality standards require materials to be tested at the manufacturer and the results of these tests be submitted through a report, also called a mill sheet, mill certificate or mill test certificate (MTC). The only way to trace a steel plate back to its mill sheet is the heat number. A heat number is similar to a lot number, which is used to identify production runs of any other product for quality control purposes.

== Numerical significance ==
Usually, but not universally, the numbers indicate:

- the first digit corresponds to the furnace number
- the second digit indicates the year in which the material was melted
- the last three (and sometimes four) indicate the melt number.
