= Thread seal tape =

Tape commonly used in plumbing

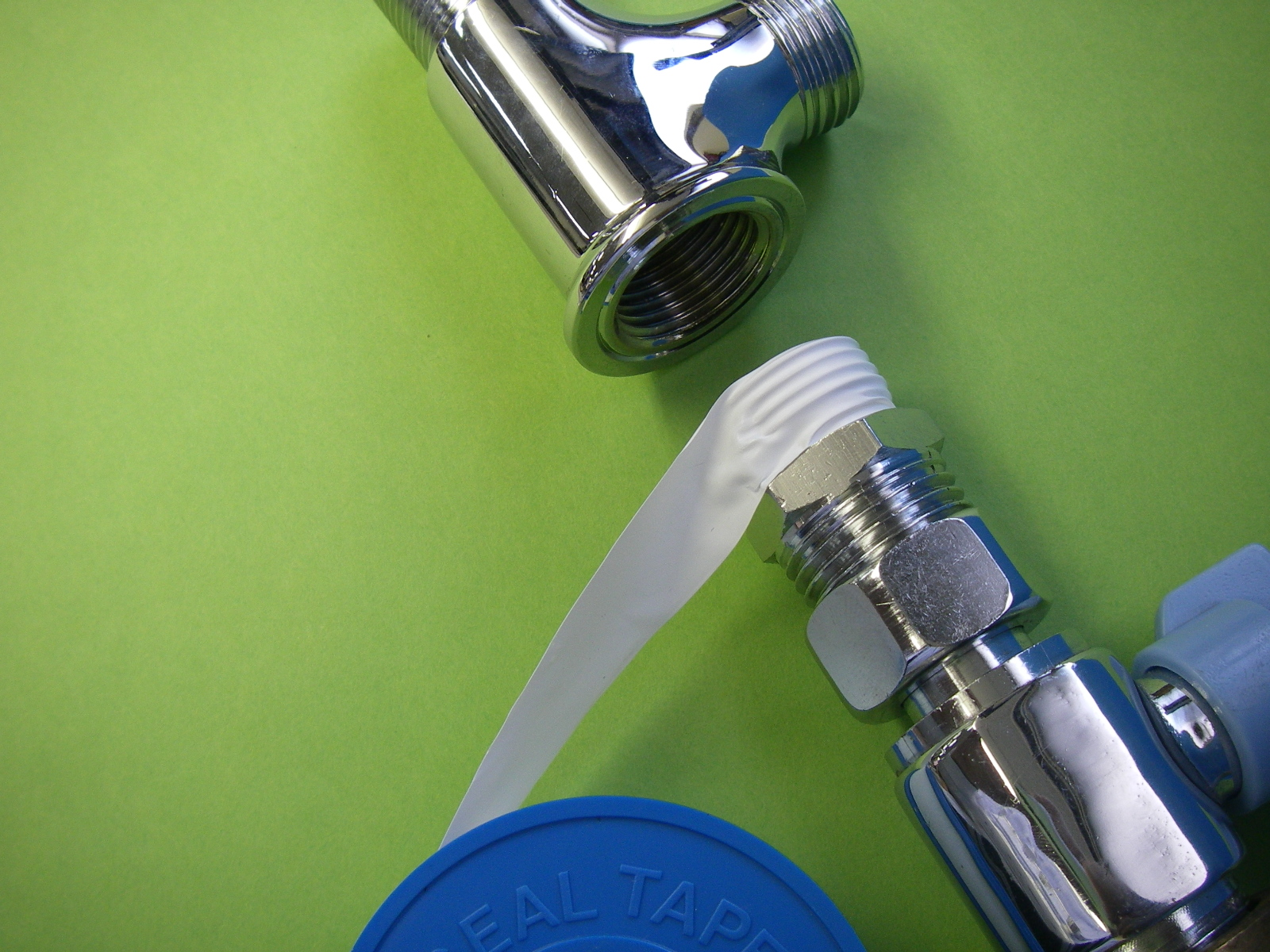
Thread seal tape is wrapped around the threads, lubricating the connection and allowing the two pieces to be screwed deeper together.

Thread seal tape (also known as PTFE tape, Teflon tape, or plumber's tape) is a polytetrafluoroethylene (PTFE) film tape commonly used in plumbing for sealing pipe threads. The tape is sold cut to specific widths and wound on a spool, making it easy to wind around pipe threads. Thread seal tape lubricates, allowing for a deeper seating of the threads, and it helps prevent the threads from seizing when being unscrewed. The tape also works as a deformable filler and thread lubricant, helping to seal the joint without hardening or making it more difficult to tighten, and instead making it easier to tighten. It also protects the threads of both pieces from direct contact with each other and physical wear.

Typically the tape is wrapped on the male threads before the parts are screwed together, in the same direction a female piece would be rotated to tighten. This method can be used to figure out tape wrapping direction regardless of which piece is fixed/stationary, or which side of the fixture the person is working from. The tape is commonly used commercially in applications including pressurized water systems, central heating systems, and air compression equipment.

== Types ==
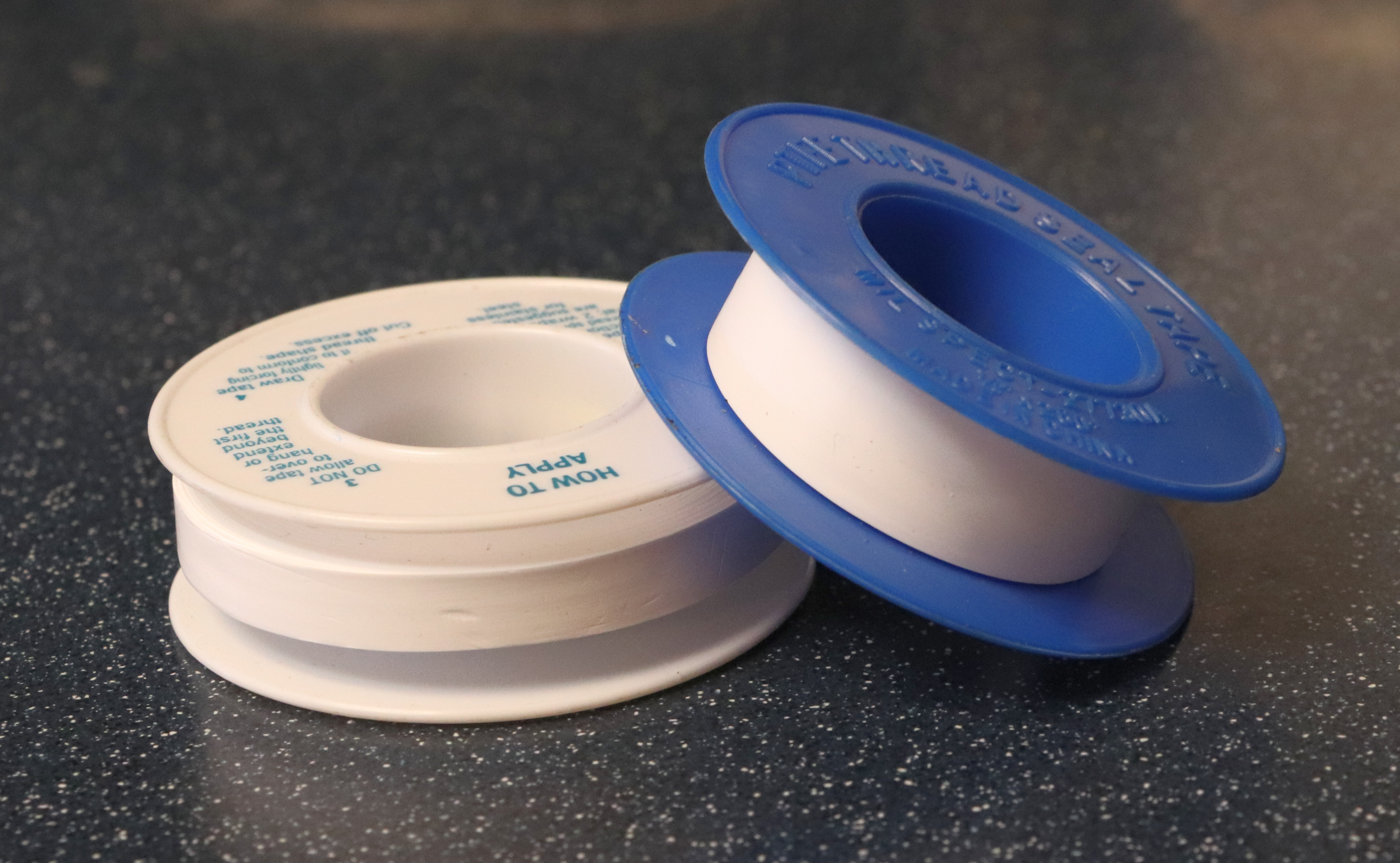
PTFE tape used for different sized fittings

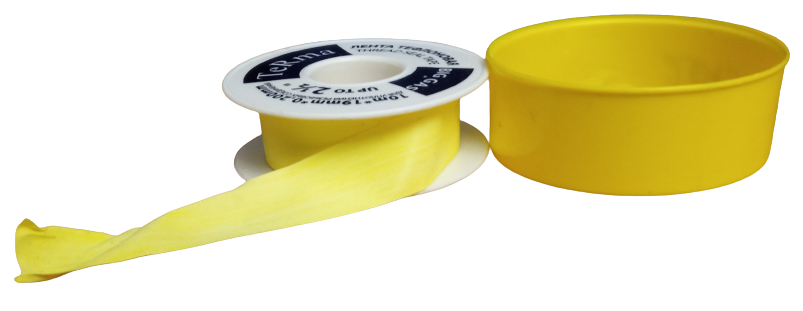
PTFE tape for natural gas

There are two US standards for determining the quality of any thread seal tape. MIL-T-27730A (an obsolete military specification still commonly used in industry in the US) requires a minimum thickness of 3.5 mils and a minimum PTFE purity of 99%. The second standard, A-A-58092, is a commercial grade which maintains the thickness requirement of MIL-T-27730A and adds a minimum density of 1.2 g/cm^{3}. Relevant standards may vary between industries; tape for gas fittings (to UK gas regulations) is required to be thicker than that for water. Although PTFE itself is suitable for use with high-pressure oxygen, the grade of tape must also be known to be free from grease.

Thread seal tape used in plumbing applications is most commonly white, but it is also available in various colors. It is often used to correspond to color coded pipelines (US, Canada, Australia, and New Zealand: yellow for natural gas, green for oxygen, etc.). These color-codes for thread sealing tape were introduced by Bill Bentley of Unasco Pty Ltd in the 1970s. In the UK, the tape is used from coloured reels, e.g. yellow reels for gas, and green for oxygen.

- White: used on NPT threads up to 3/8 inch
- Yellow: used on NPT threads 1/2 inch to 2 inch, often labeled "gas tape"
- Pink: used on NPT threads 1/2 inch to 2 inch, safe for potable water
- Green: oil-free PTFE used on oxygen lines and some specific medical gasses
- Gray: contains nickel, anti-seizing, anti-galling, and anti-corrosion, used for stainless pipes
- Copper: contains copper granules and is certified as a thread lubricant but not a sealer

In the European Union the EN 751-3:2022+A1:2024 specifies the sealing materials for metallic threaded joints in contact with 1st, 2nd and 3rd family gases and hot water Part 3: Unsintered PTFE tapes and PTFE strings.

In the UK, the BSI standard BS-7786:2006 specifies various grades and quality standards of PTFE thread sealing tape.

== Uses ==
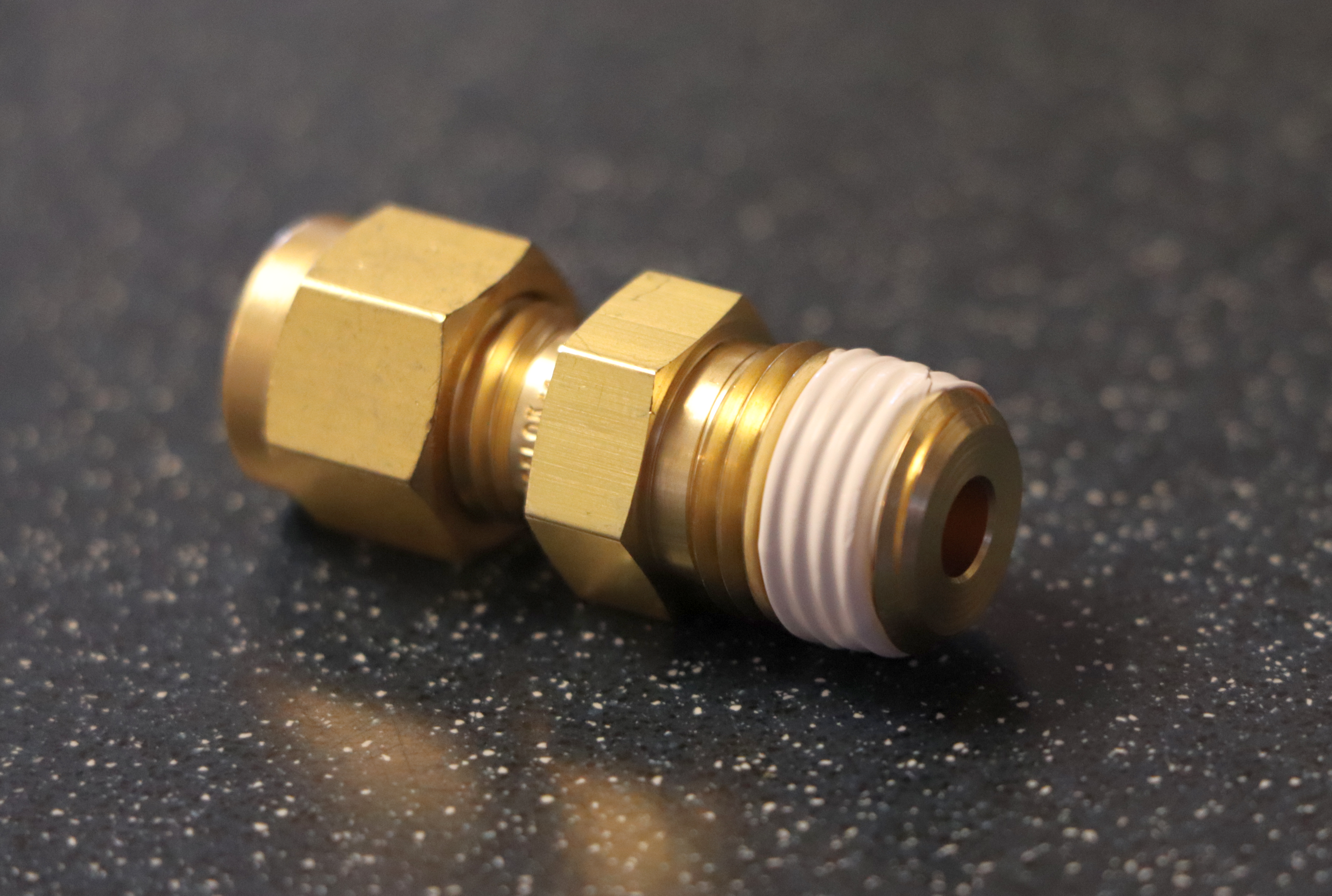
PTFE tape applied on an NPT fitting, in the direction of the threads.

Thread seal tape is appropriate for use on tapered threads, where the sealing force is a wedge action. Parallel threads may not seal effectively with or without tape, as they are intended to be sealed by a gasket.

Thread seal tape is almost always applied by hand, although at least one machine is available for the production wrapping of fittings.

Thread seal tape is also commonly used in the stretching of body piercings, through a process known as taping, because it is inert and safe for this use. The wearer wraps a layer of tape around a plug and uses the jewelry, adding another layer every few days, thus gradually stretching the piercing.

=== Hazards ===
Overuse or misapplication of thread seal tape may be a hazard. Excess application of tape can prevent mating threads from fully engaging, reducing the shear point of the threads. Combining thread seal tape with a pipe dope compound can also overload threads. Also, internal overhangs of loose material may constrict a joint or slough off and form a foreign body that could jam a valve seat. Therefore, using tape as a thread sealant is generally not considered appropriate in fluid power systems. Overheating to 550 °F (288 °C) and subsequent decomposition of Teflon can produce perfluoroisobutene, a toxic and potentially fatal gas.

== Use of names ==
Familiarity with the Teflon brand of fluoropolymers has led to the name becoming a generic trademark, and the practice of referring to any PTFE-based thread seal tape as "Teflon tape". Chemours, owner of the Teflon trademark, no longer manufactures any thread seal tape, and objects to this practice.

Most references to "plumber's tape" nowadays refer to thread seal tape; however, the original use in the plumbing trade describes a strap of material with holes in it used for supporting pipes and fixtures.

== See also ==
- Pipe dope
