= Panzergewinde =

Former Central European screw thread standard

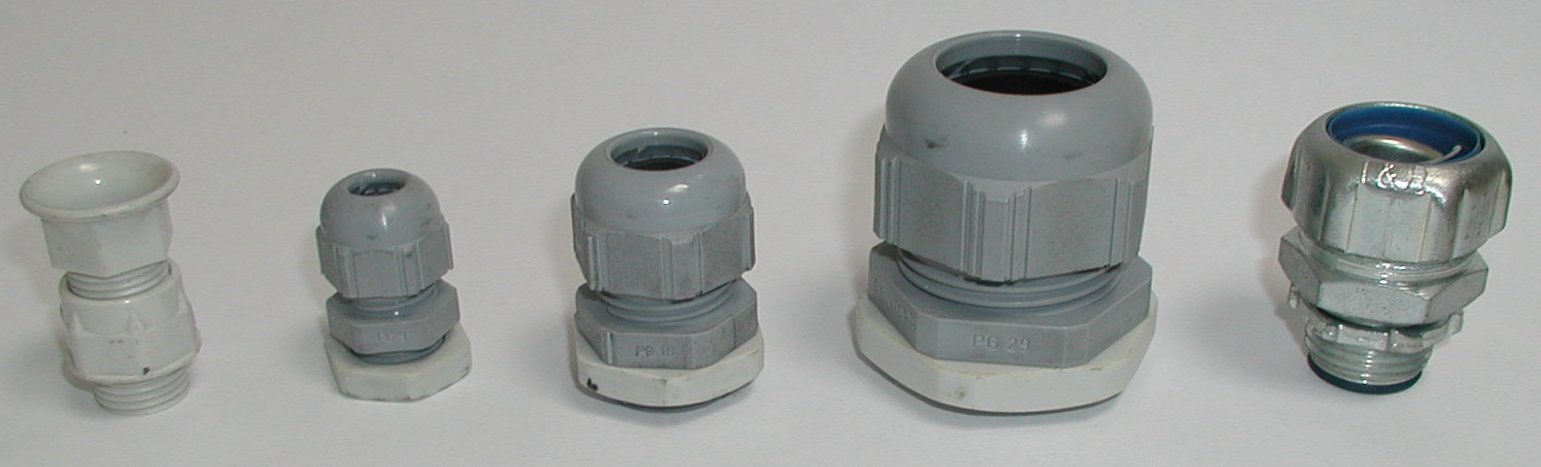
An assortment of PG cable glands. Similar glands with DIN/ISO metric threads are also available.

The Stahlpanzerrohrgewinde (German: [ˈʃtaːlˌpantsɐʁoːɐ̯.ɡəˌvɪndə], "steel conduit thread") standard for screw threads, more often called by the shortened Panzergewinde (German: [ˈpantsɐɡəˌvɪndə]), was a technical standard created in Germany and subsequently used in Switzerland, Austria, and other neighboring European countries. It was retracted in 2003. The thread is used to join pieces of electrical conduit and cable glands.

Alternative stylings of the German name are Stahl-Panzer-Rohr-Gewinde, an abbreviated form StaPa-Rohr-Gewinde, and the acronym PG.

== Overview ==
The standard, codified by the Deutsches Institut für Normung (DIN, German Institute for Standardization), is DIN 40430. Panzergewinde sizes are named with the prefix PG plus a nominal number which approximately corresponds to the maximum cable diameter (in millimeters) that can be passed through the conduit.

Because the walls of the conduit are usually relatively thin, the thread depth is limited. Thus a thread angle of 80° is used. The Verband der Elektrotechnik, Elektronik und Informationstechnik (VDE) originally standardized the thread for use with conduit and cable glands that were made of steel. Today the thread is used with both steel (typically plated to resist rusting) and polyvinyl chloride (PVC).

Beginning in 2000, the VDE standard for cable glands (VDE 0619) was formally replaced by EN 50262. After a transitional period of several years during which it could still be used, it was replaced in 2003 by a final metric fine thread with 1.5 mm (0.0591 in) pitch. Similarly, conduit threads were replaced by EN 60423.

Even today, Panzergewinde cable glands are still often found on chemical reactors and bioreactors (for example, PG13.5 thread for screwing in sensors) and various other equipment, enclosures, junction boxes, and connectors.

== Gland sizes ==
| Thread nominal size | Thread major dia. | | Thread density (TPI) | Thread pitch | | Inner diameter | | Cable diameter | |
| Thread nominal size | (mm) | (in) | Thread density (TPI) | (mm) | (in) | (mm) | (in) | (mm) | (in) |
|---|---|---|---|---|---|---|---|---|---|
| PG7 | 12.5 | 0.492 | 20 | 1.27 | 0.05 | 11.28 | 0.444 | 3–6.5 | 0.118–0.256 |
| PG9 | 15.2 | 0.598 | 18 | 1.4112 | 0.0556 | 13.86 | 0.546 | 4–8 | 0.157–0.315 |
| PG11 | 18.6 | 0.732 | 18 | 1.4112 | 0.0556 | 17.26 | 0.680 | 5–10 | 0.197–0.394 |
| PG13.5 | 20.4 | 0.803 | 18 | 1.4112 | 0.0556 | 19.06 | 0.750 | 6–12 | 0.236–0.472 |
| PG16 | 22.5 | 0.886 | 18 | 1.4112 | 0.0556 | 21.16 | 0.833 | 10–14 | 0.394–0.551 |
| PG21 | 28.3 | 1.114 | 16 | 1.5875 | 0.0625 | 26.78 | 1.054 | 13–18 | 0.512–0.709 |
| PG29 | 37.0 | 1.457 | 16 | 1.5875 | 0.0625 | 35.48 | 1.397 | 18–25 | 0.709–0.984 |
| PG36 | 47.0 | 1.850 | 16 | 1.5875 | 0.0625 | 45.48 | 1.791 | 24–32 | 0.945–1.260 |
| PG42 | 54.0 | 2.126 | 16 | 1.5875 | 0.0625 | 52.48 | 2.066 | 32–38 | 1.260–1.496 |
| PG48 | 59.3 | 2.335 | 16 | 1.5875 | 0.0625 | 57.78 | 2.275 | 37–44 | 1.457–1.732 |

== See also ==
- Threaded pipe
