= Pipe dope =

Pipe joint sealant

Pipe dope is any thread lubricant, thread sealing compound, or anaerobic chemical sealant that is used to make a pipe thread joint leakproof and pressure tight. It is also referred to as "thread compound" or "pipe thread sealant." Although common pipe threads are tapered and therefore will achieve an interference fit during proper assembly, machining and finishing variances usually result in a fit that does not result in 100 percent contact between the mating components. The application of pipe dope prior to assembly will fill the minute voids between the threads, thus making the joint pressure tight. Pipe dope also acts as a lubricant and helps prevent seizing of the mating parts, which can later cause difficulty during disassembly.

== Composition ==
A material safety data sheet reports that the "Permatex" 51D pipe joint compound contains kaolin, vegetable oil, rosin, ethanol, etc. The ingredients are designed to:

1. fill minute spaces between mating pipe fittings (kaolin), and
2. serve as a lubricant as the fittings are forced together (vegetable oil).

Various types of pipe dope formulation exist, the appropriate type being determined by the application, e.g., pneumatic, hydraulic, caustic, etc., as well as the expected pressure. Improper selection of the type of pipe dope may result in leakage despite the best assembly practices.

As recently as the 1950s, toxic lead oxide mixed with spar varnish was used as a dope for drinking water pipes. Litharge (a form of lead oxide) mixed with glycerine was also used in some applications. Litharge was also the recommended pipe dope for fuel piping.

Pipe dopes used in oil drilling frequently include powdered graphite, lead and zinc, and sometimes copper suspended in grease. In the past, nickel, talc, silica, calcium carbonate and clay have been included. Heavy metals make up to 25% of the volume of the dope. Silicone is included to improve application to wet or cold surfaces.

== Plastic pipes ==
Petroleum-based pipe dope is not intended for use on threaded PVC, CPVC or ABS pipe and fittings since it will deteriorate the plastic. Builders in the US are expected to use thread compounds that meet ASTM F2331 - Standard Test Method for Determining Chemical Compatibility of Thread Sealants with Thermoplastic Threaded Pipe and Fittings Materials or thread seal tape on PVC, CPVC and ABS threads.

== See also ==
- Thread seal tape
