= Nipple (plumbing) =

Fitting used in plumbing and piping

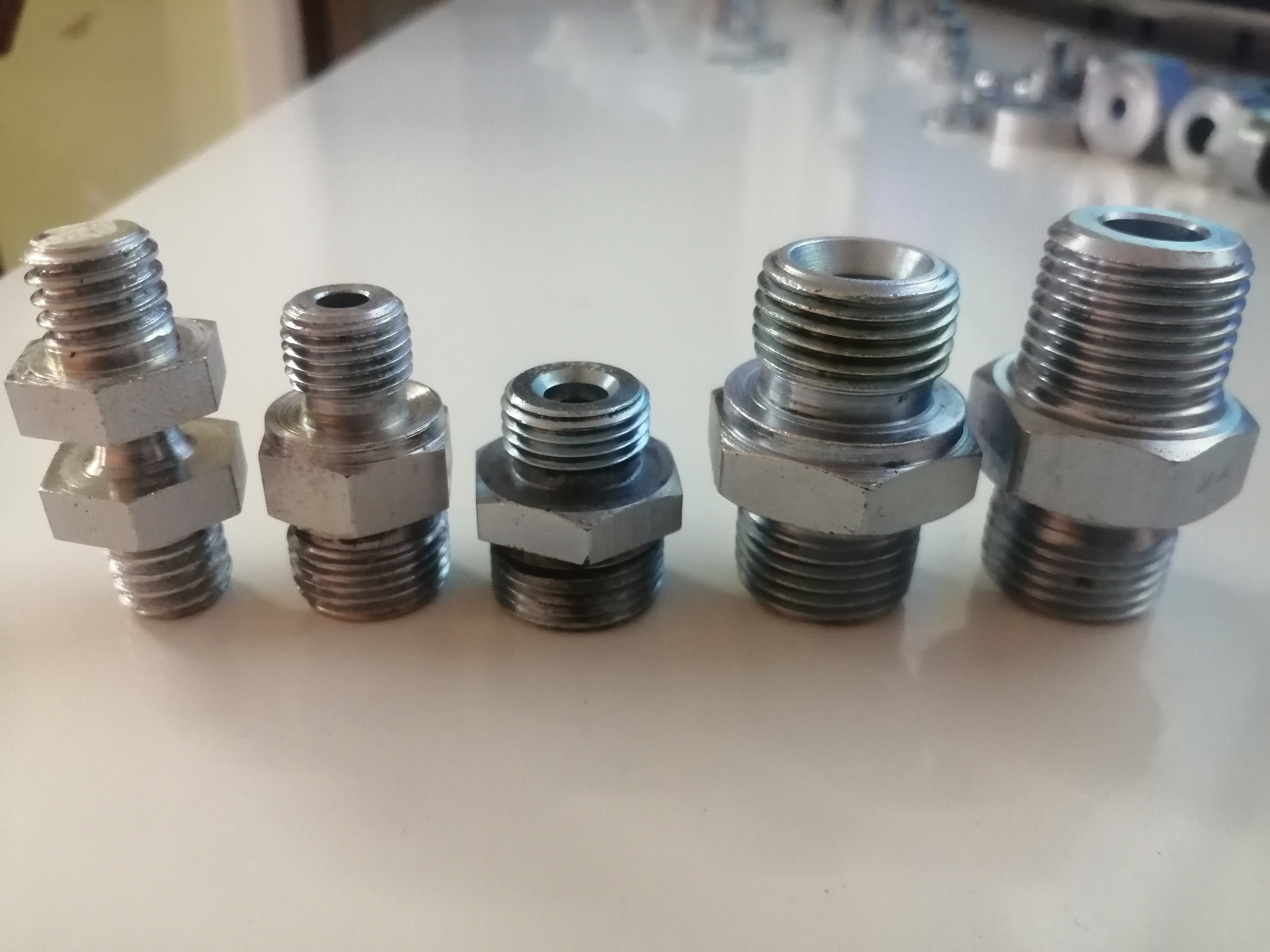
Nipple

In plumbing and piping, a nipple is a fitting, consisting of a short piece of pipe, usually provided with a male pipe thread at each end, for connecting two other fittings.

The length of the nipple is usually specified by the overall length with thread. It may have a hexagonal section in the center for a wrench to grasp (sometimes referred to as a "hex nipple"), or it may simply be made from a short piece of pipe (sometimes referred to as a "barrel nipple" or "pipe nipple"). A "close nipple" has no unthreaded area; when screwed tightly between two female fittings, very little of the nipple remains exposed. A close nipple can only be unscrewed by gripping one threaded end with a pipe wrench which will damage the threads and necessitate replacing the nipple, or by using a specialty tool known as a nipple wrench (or known as an internal pipe wrench) which grips the inside of the pipe, leaving the threads undamaged. When the ends are of two different sizes it is called a reducer or unequal nipple.

Threads used on nipples are BSP, BSPT, NPT, NPSM and Metric.

== Chase nipple ==
A chase nipple is a short pipe fitting, which creates a path for wires between two electrical boxes. A chase nipple has male threads on one end only. The other end is a hexagon. The chase nipple passes through the knockouts of two boxes, and is secured by an internally threaded ring called a lock nut.

Chase-Shawmut Company, of Boston, is the company which first produced chase nipples.

== See also ==
- Coupling (piping)
- Piping and plumbing fitting
- Street elbow
