= Street elbow =

Angled pipe fitting

A street elbow (sometimes called a street ell or service ell) is a type of plumbing or piping fitting intended to join a piece of pipe and another fitting at an angle. The difference between a street elbow and a regular elbow is the gender of its two connections.

A regular elbow has a hub or female-threaded connection on each end, so it can join two male pipes. Instead, a street elbow has a female fitting on one end and a male fitting on the other. The advantage of the street elbow is that it can be connected directly to another fitting without having to use an additional short connecting piece (a pipe nipple).

== Applications ==
Street elbows are available with bend angles of 90°, 45°, and 22.5°. They can be used in many plumbing applications, including water supply, drainage, sewers, vents, central vacuum systems, compressed air and gas lines, heating and air conditioning, sump pump drains, and other locations where plumbing fittings would be used to join sections of pipe.

Plumbing codes regulate the use of street elbows. For example, Canada's national plumbing code prohibits them in natural gas and propane installations:

Street elbows and tees are not permitted because these fittings have both male and female threaded ends. This makes alignment of the piping difficult since the direction of the piping does not always correspond with the fully seated position of the fitting. When the connection is backed off to align the piping, leakage may result.

== See also ==
- Coupling (piping)
- Elbow (piping)
- Piping and plumbing fittings
