= Hinetics =

Clean tech startup

Hinetics is a clean technology startup focused on the development of high specific power, high efficiency electric motors and generators for electrified aircraft and offshore wind turbine applications. Hinetics' product portfolio is composed of both permanent magnet electric machines as well as lower TRL superconducting electric machines. The company was spun-off from the Haran Research Group, led by Professor Kiruba Haran, at the University of Illinois at Urbana-Champaign in 2017 to commercialize a slotless motor topology developed under a NASA NRA award.

Hinetics is primarily funded through SBIR/STTR small business grants from NASA, the USAF's AFWERX, and the NSF. They have received more than $3 million from these entities to date through Phase I, Phase II, and Phase III grants. In August 2022, the company was awarded the largest contract in ARPA-E's OPEN 2021 solicitation, totaling $5.7 million, to develop a 10 MW superconducting electric motor for electric aircraft propulsion.

In May 2025, Hinetics demonstrated the world's first fully-integrated, cryogen-free superconducting electric machine. The sub-scale demonstrator, nicknamed "Baby Yoda", consisted of an industrial motor retrofitted with a superconducting rotor having only electrical interfaces. The elimination of rotary transfer couplings, auxiliary cryogenic infrastructure, rotating seals, vacuum ports, and additional balance of plant presents a step change in the commercial viability of superconducting technology.
