= Oederlin =

Swiss manufacturer, 1858 to 2015

- Logo used since 2015

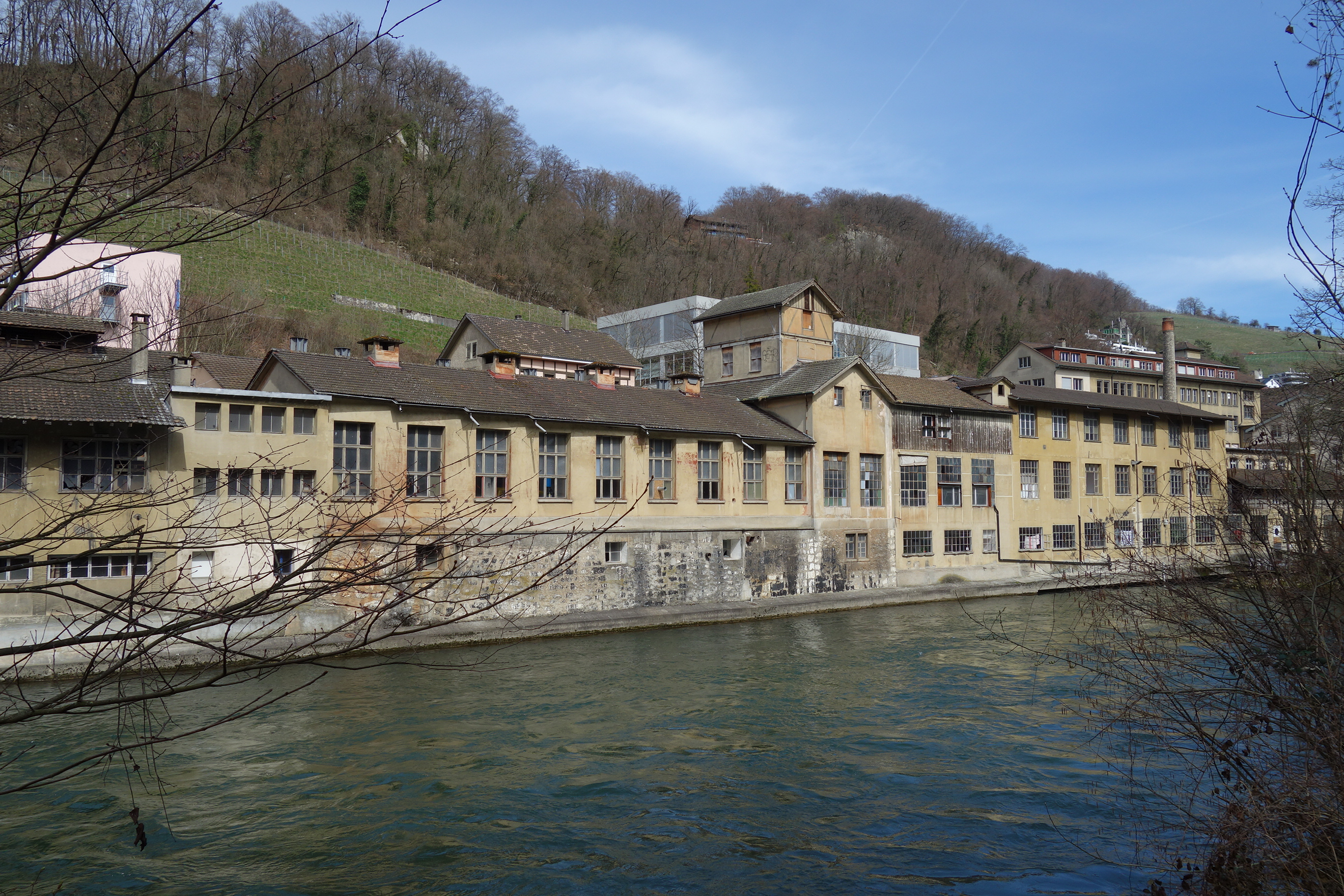
- Oederlin's former manufacturing plant in Baden, Switzerland
- Native name: Oederlin AG
- Formerly: Oederlin Giesserei AG
- Industry: Manufacturing (former), Real Estate (current)
- Founded: 1858; 168 years ago
- Defunct: 2015
- Number of employees: 1000+
- Website: oederlin.ch

Oederlin (German pronunciation: [ˈøːdɐlɪn]; Respectively Oederlin AG; formerly Oederlin Giesserei AG) was a Swiss industrial concern notable for manufacturing industrial fittings for a variety of industries since 1858. Headquartered in Baden, Switzerland the company employed 1,000+ people at its peak. Oederlin AG currently remains as real estate management company, manufacturing operations ceased in 2015.
