= Coupling (piping) =

Short length of pipe which allows two other pipes to be joined

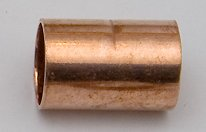
Pipe coupling (copper sweat)

In piping and plumbing, a coupling (or coupler) is a very short length of pipe or tube, with a socket at one or both ends that allows two pipes or tubes to be joined, welded (steel), brazed or soldered (copper, brass etc.) together.

Alternatively it is a short length of pipe with two female National pipe threads (NPT) (in North American terms, a coupler is a double female while a nipple is double male) or two male or female British standard pipe threads.

If the two ends of a coupling are of different standards or joining methods, the coupling is called an adapter. Examples of adapters include one end BSP threaded with the other NPT threaded, and one end threaded with the other a plain socket for brazing.

A coupling whose ends use the same connection method but are of different sizes is called a reducing coupling or reducer. An example is a 3/4" NPT to 1/2" NPT coupling.

== See also ==
- Closet flange
- Eccentric reducer
- Nipple (plumbing)
- Piping and plumbing fittings
- Reducer
- Street elbow

== External resources ==
- PDF illustrating assorted adapters
