= Concentric reducer =

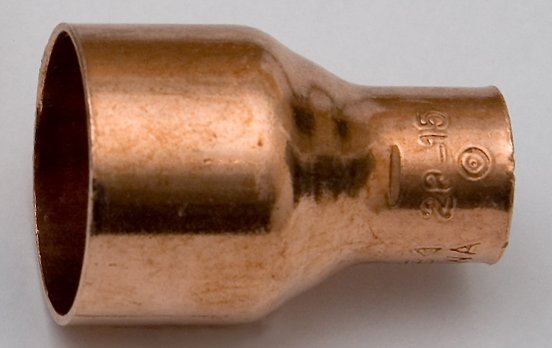
A copper concentric reducer

A concentric reducer is used to join pipe sections or tube sections on the same axis. The concentric reducer is cone-shaped, and is used when there is a shift in diameter between pipes. For example, when a 1" pipe transitions into a 3/4" pipe and the top or bottom of the pipe doesn't need to remain level. This pipe reducer may be used when there is a single diameter change or multiple diameter changes.

Unlike eccentric reducers, concentric reducers have a common center line. Concentric reducers are useful when cavitation is present. Eccentricity occurs when the centerline is offset.

A lined concentric reducer offers the same functionality as a standard concentric reducer but with an added internal lining, typically made from materials like PTFE, rubber, or ceramic. This lining enhances resistance to corrosion, abrasion, and chemical attack, making it ideal for handling aggressive fluids in industries such as chemical processing, oil and gas, and wastewater treatment. By maintaining the pipe’s centerline alignment while providing superior durability, a lined concentric reducer ensures smooth flow, minimizes pressure drops, and extends the lifespan of the piping system

== See also ==
- Piping and plumbing fitting
- Reducer
