= Snaking =

Snaking may refer to:

- Use of plumber's snake
- Snaking (logging), a way of moving timber in logging
- Undulating motion
- A technique used in Mario Kart DS to boost speed
