= Nipple wrench (plumbing) =

Inside pipe wrench tool in plumbing

In plumbing, a nipple wrench is often known as an inside pipe wrench.

An eccentric toothed gear is mounted on a hexagonal shaft. The wrench is introduced inside the pipe (especially a close nipple, which has threading its entire length, and therefore no surface for an outside wrench). As the wrench is turned, the eccentric gear is forced to grip the inside of the pipe. As with a regular pipe wrench, the mechanism is such that the grip on the pipe increases with the torque applied on the wrench.

It is a relatively obscure but often useful tool.
