= Kiruba Sivasubramaniam =

American engineer

Kiruba Haran
- Other name: Kiruba Sivasubramaniam
- Education: Rensselaer Polytechnic Institute, PhD, 1995-2000 Rensselaer Polytechnic Institute, M.S, 1997 Obafemi Awolowo University, B.S, 1988-1994
- Occupation: Engineer • researcher • professor
- Employer: University of Illinois, Urbana-Champaign
- Known for: Founder of Hinetics

Kiruba Sivasubramaniam Haran is an American engineer and professor. He is the Grainger Endowed Director's Chair in Electric Machinery and Electromechanics in the Department of Electrical and Computer Engineering at the University of Illinois at Urbana-Champaign. He also serves as the director of the POETS Engineering Research Center, funded by the National Science Foundation (NSF), and is the director of the Grainger Center for Electric Machinery and Electromechanics (CEME). Haran leads a research group focused on electrical machines at the University of Illinois. He is the founder and the Chief Technology Officer of Hinetics, a clean energy aviation start-up.

Haran was named as Associated Fellow of the American Institute of Aeronautics and Astronautics (AIAA) in 2019. He is also a Fellow of the Institute of Electrical and Electronics Engineers (IEEE) and a recipient of the IEEE-PES Cyril Veinott Electromechanical Energy Award in 2019 for contributions to advanced electric machinery technology and application.

== Biography ==
After receiving his PhD, Haran began working at General Electric (GE) Research in Niskayuna, New York. At GE, he led the research group working on advanced electrical machines for the entire organization's industrial businesses. In this role, he was responsible for a broad set of technology development activities, including projects on novel machines for aviation, renewable energy, defense, appliances, EV's, locomotives, and mining equipment. After 13 years at GE, Haran and his family moved to Champaign, Illinois to continue his research at the University of Illinois at Urbana-Champaign. At the University of Illinois, Haran's research is concentrated on high-specific power cryogenic and non-cryogenic machines for electrified transportation and renewable energy applications.

== Research ==
Haran's research areas include electric transportation, electrical machines and drive systems, and power and energy systems. His broader research topics are electric transportation, energy, solar and renewable technology, and storage and conversion.

== Publications ==
- Haran, K., Madavan, N., & O'Connell, T. (Eds.). (2022). Electrified Aircraft Propulsion: Powering the Future of Air Transportation. Cambridge: Cambridge University Press. doi:10.1017/9781108297684

== Awards/Honors ==
- Member of the United States National Academy of Engineering (2024)
- AIAA Associate Fellow (2019)
- IEEE PES Cyril Veinott Electromechanical Energy Conversion Award (2019)
- IEEE PES Distinguished Lecturer (2017 - Current)
- IEEE Fellow (2014)
- Hull Award, GE Global Research (2006)
- Allen B. Dumont Prize, Rensselaer Polytechnic Institute (2000)
