= Driving cap =

A driving cap is a special type of pipe cap used to provide a striking surface for a hammer while simultaneously protecting the end of the pipe from deformation. A driving cap is made of much thicker or more durable material than a standard pipe cap and is always removed once installation is complete.

Driving caps serve no function in the operation of a pipe and may even be incapable of doing so. This is because the driving cap is cast from a material selected for its strength and not its corrosion resistance. Thus replacement of the driving cap with a different fitting becomes necessary to prevent failures in materials handling pipe. Also, driving caps are not attractive in appearance, which is detrimental in residential and ornamental applications.
