= Rotary union =

Union that allows for rotation of the united parts

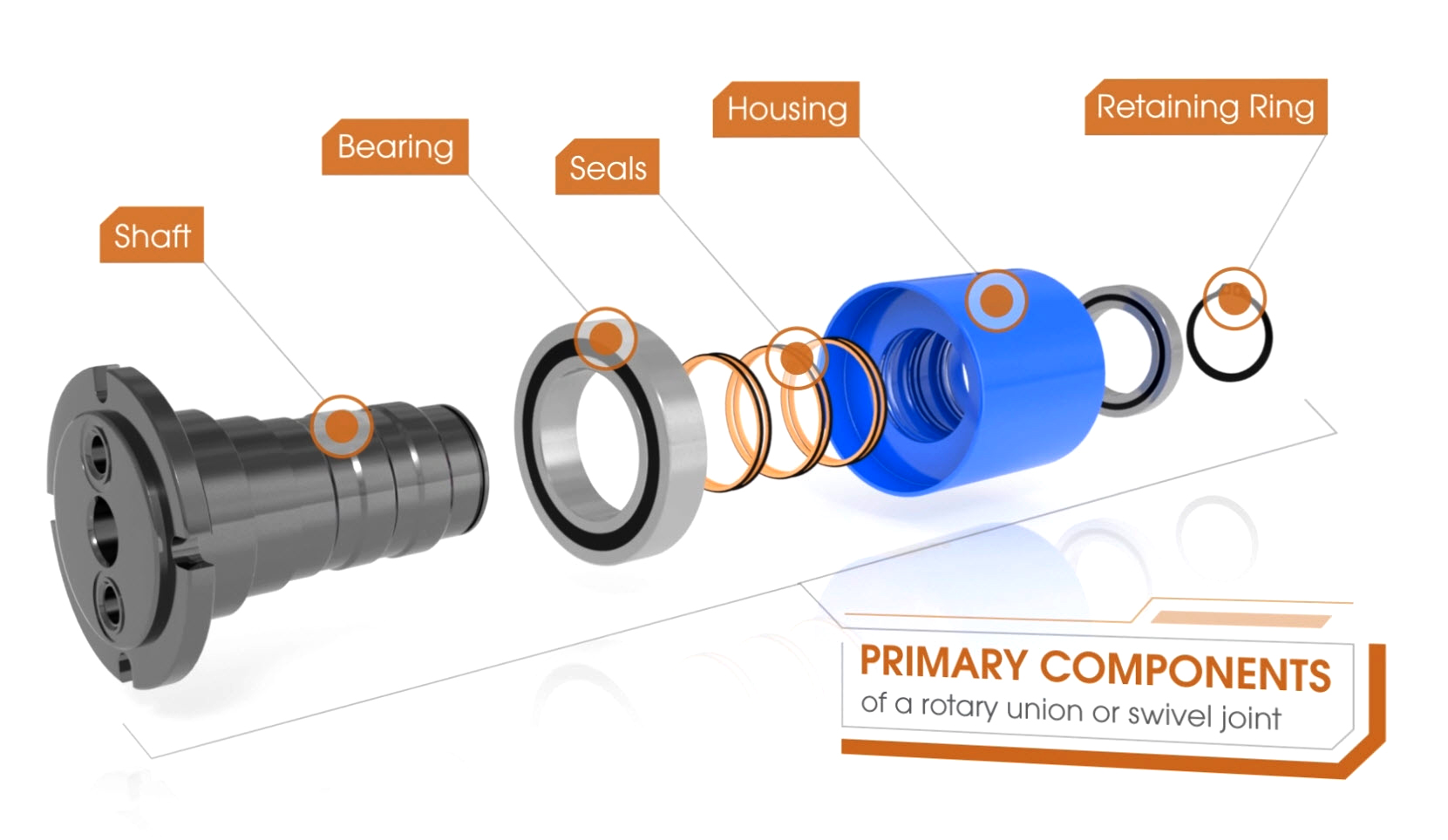
Image of components in a rotary union; a shaft, housing, bearings, seals and retaining clip. The independent shaft and housing allow for continuous rotation of either component. This is an example of a two-passage rotary union with independent channels that allow both liquids and gases to transfer simultaneously.

A rotary union is a union that allows for rotation of the united parts. It is thus a device that provides a seal between a stationary supply passage (such as pipe or tubing) and a rotating part (such as a drum, cylinder, or spindle) to permit the flow of a fluid into and/or out of the rotating part. Fluids typically used with rotary joints and rotating unions include various heat transfer media and fluid power media such as steam, water, thermal oil, hydraulic fluid, and coolants. A rotary union is sometimes referred to as a rotating union, rotary valve, swivel union, rotorseal, rotary couplings, rotary joint, rotating joints, hydraulic coupling, pneumatic rotary union, through bore rotary union, air rotary union, electrical rotary union, or vacuum rotary union.

== Function ==
A rotary union will lock onto an input valve while rotating to meet an outlet. During this time the liquid and/or gas will flow into the rotary union from its source and will be held within the device during its movement. This liquid and/or gas will leave the union when the valve openings meet during rotation, and more liquid and/or gas will flow into the union again for the next rotation. Often functioning under high pressure and constant movement, a rotary union is designed to rotate around an axis. A rotary union's design can be altered to change this or to increase the psi or rpm it needs to withstand as well as the number of valves required.

== Composition ==
While rotary unions come in many shapes, sizes, and configurations, they always have the same four basic components: a housing unit, a shaft, a bearing (mechanical) (or bearings), and a seal. Rotary unions typically are constructed from stainless steel to resist rust and corrosion, but many other metals can be involved, like aluminum.

=== Housing ===
The housing is the component that holds all of the other elements of the rotary union together. The housing has an inlet port, which is a threaded port to which the hose supplying the medium will be attached. The rotary union may also have an outlet port if the same joint is being used both to supply fluid to a roll and to remove fluid from the roll. In smaller rotary unions the housing is stationary. In larger rotary unions the housing is usually bolted to the drum or roll using a flange. In these cases, the housing rotates at the same speed as the drum

=== Shaft ===
The shaft is the component that carries the medium through the rotary union into the drum or roll. In many cases, the shaft will turn with the drum or roll. In some cases, like in larger flanged rotary unions, the shaft may be stationary while the housing rotates. The bearings and seal are typically assembled around the shaft.

=== Bearing ===
The second most important part of the rotary union is the bearing. A rotary union may have only one bearing, but multiple bearings are much more common. Roller bearings; such as ball bearings and tapered roller bearings; or non-roller bearings, like graphite bearings and bronze bushings, may be used in a rotary union. The bearings are always used to allow a part of the joint, either the shaft or the housing, to rotate.

=== Mechanical seal ===
The heart of the rotary union is the seal. The seal prevents the medium from leaking outside the rotary union while in operation. Seal types can vary from pusher-type end-face mechanical seals, non-pusher-type end-face mechanical seals, lip seals, and o-ring seals. Most rotary unions have more than one seal.

== Types of rotary unions ==
Many rotary unions incorporate multiple ports, some of which are designed to handle different types of material simultaneously. A rotary union with a straight port transfers the substance directly through the rotary union. Other designs include an elbow port, which causes the material to flow out at an angle, and multiple ports. A multiple-port rotary union looks like a perforated cylinder. At the end of the cylinder is a threaded screw with a seal or seals that lock onto it. The transferred material flows into the cylinder and out of the input holes.

In the case of a rotary union with multiple inputs, chambers separated by seals keep the materials from inadvertently mixing. This type of rotary union is often used in the manufacture of plastics and other petroleum products, for which multiple inputs may need to be streamlined, but kept separate.

Rotary unions can be classified according to the media they transfer. For example, if they carry coolant, they are referred to as coolant unions. The same is also true for other media like water, air, steam, etc.

== Uses ==
Many assembly lines incorporate multiple rotary unions because they are highly versatile and take up less space than other devices designed for a similar purpose. Rotary unions also appear in automobiles and other machines that require constant supplies of lubrication, air, or other liquids for moving parts to run smoothly. Brakes, for example, use rotary unions to maintain a constant supply of pressurized brake fluid. Rotary unions are also heavily used in crude oil processing, the chemical industry, commercial food production, and pharmaceutical applications.

=== Agriculture ===
Equipment used in grain harvesting including combines, tractors, grain carts, and threshers employ rotary unions. Once harvested, many crops will be processed with equipment that uses rotary unions. Food processing equipment that uses rotary unions includes cooling conveyors, flaking mills, shredders, steam cookers, starch dryers, rotary cutters, and roll-forming.

=== Automotive ===
Auto manufacturing is a diverse user of rotary unions for a broad range of parts or components and materials, whether machined steel, iron or aluminum, stampings, plastics, glass, or paperboard. Rotary unions are used for operations that require coolant, lubricant, or hydraulics.

=== Car washes ===
There are two kinds of car wash facilities that use unions: the automatic and the hand-operated. Most manufacturers of automatic systems have several revolving brushes that use 55 series to introduce low-pressure detergent water through the supporting shaft to the brushes. In addition, automatic car washes have spinners that require rotary unions to transmit high-pressure water into the spinning mechanisms.

=== Converting ===
Downstream processing of paper, plastic film, foil, and related substrate materials into finished, printed packaging such as bags, pouches, labels, tags, folding cartons, and corrugated shipping cases is called converting. Rotary unions are used in all types of converting for water, steam, thermal oil, air, or hydraulics.

=== Machine tools ===
Rotary unions may be used to transmit coolant, cutting oil, MQL, and pressurized air in a bearingless or bearing-supported configuration. Besides coolant delivery, rotary unions are used for chucking, tool sensing, rotary index tables, and other machine tool applications.

=== Mining ===
Electro-hydraulic equipment used in mining operations can employ rotary unions including shuttle cars and coal cars, drill heads, backhoes, clamshell cranes, and draglines. In addition, boom hoists, retrieving drums, and bucket drum clutches each require rotary unions.

=== Oil and gas ===
Drilling rigs (oil or gas) use air clutches and brakes that require rotary unions. Water unions are used to flush mud from the drill tip, and must withstand shock and vibration in this severe application. Oil and petrochemical refineries use batch mixers, flaking mills, blenders, and drying rolls that each require rotary unions. The development of subsea oil and gas fields requires specialized equipment. Subsea swivels, manufactured by Dynamic Sealing Technologies, Inc., are designed for deepwater oil production systems that provide equipment operations added flexibility when lowering flowlines in harsh waters down to depths reaching 3,500 meters.

=== Paper ===
Paper applications span the supply chain from the raw pulp and paper mills to the downstream paper converters. Mills use steam joint and siphon systems and water unions for heating and cooling. Converters use rotary unions for heating and cooling rolls, as well as winders with air clutches and brakes.

=== Plastics ===
The manufacturing of plastic materials encompasses a wide variety of applications including cast film, blown film, foam, flexible and rigid sheet extrusion, single and multi-layer co-extrusion, blow molding, thermoforming, pelletizing, wire and cable, injection molding, and winding. Rotary unions are used for heating or cooling the many processing rolls throughout a wide variety of applications. In addition, rotary unions for air and hydraulic service are used in winding and injection molding applications. Many of today's modern winding applications will also utilize electrical slip rings.

=== Printing ===
Printing on flexible rolls of paper or plastic films requires rotary unions for air or hydraulics, as well as chill rolls for temperature control. Web offset and sheet printing equipment use many rotary unions on the ink vibrator and chill rolls.

=== Rubber ===
Rubber is compounded on big industrial mixers which use rotary unions for water-cooled rolls. Rubber extrusion is similar to plastic extrusion, with rotary unions used to cool the extruder screw.

=== Steel ===
The steel industry is one of the largest users of rotary unions primarily for continuous casting machines (CCM) which use rotary unions to cool the numerous rolls that support molten slabs as they move by gravity through various segments onto a run-out table to downstream annealing and heat treating. The slab is formed into a coil or sheet. The coil is further converted into processing centers that require hydraulic unions for the actuation of mandrels.

=== Textiles ===
The textile industry is a large user of water, steam, and hot oil unions. Weaving, dyeing and finishing processes are the largest users of rotary unions.

=== Tires ===
Rubber tire plants use industrial mixers, extruders, calendar train cooling stacks, and rayon slashers to make tire cords. Rotary unions are used in every process for temperature control.
