= Lead wool =

Thin strands of lead

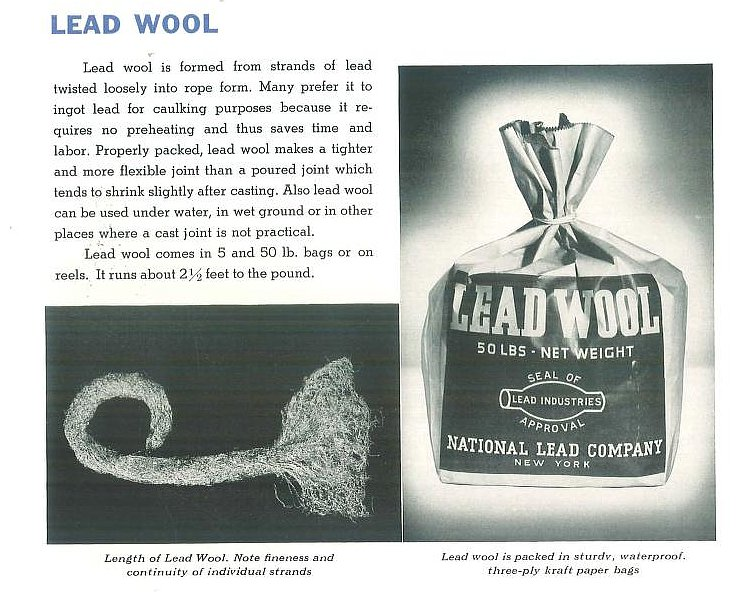
Lead wool, loose and bagged. From a trade catalog, 1947.

Lead wool consists of thin strands of lead metal that can be used to cold-caulk cast iron and steel pipes. It was manufactured by the New York Lead Wool Company in the United States and by The Lead Wool Company, Limited in Snodland, Kent, England.

The Lead Wool Company (the British company) was incorporated on 9 October 1919 (although some references indicate that it was active before that date) and was still active in 1983. The British company also developed a device to test pipe joints internally.

The company's factory had been demolished by 1994, according to a report on archaeological excavations near the factory's site.

Lead wool is presently manufactured in the UK by Calder Industrial Materials Limited.
