= Eccentric reducer =

An eccentric reducer is a fitting used in piping systems between two pipes of different diameters. The same fitting can be used in reverse as an eccentric increaser or expander. They are used where the diameter of the pipe on the upstream side of the fitting (i.e. where flow is coming from) is larger than the downstream side, and where there is a danger that vapour may accumulate. Unlike a concentric reducer, which resembles a cone, eccentric reducers have an edge that is parallel to the connecting pipe, referred to as the flat side. This parallel edge results in the two pipes having offset center lines. Because eccentric reducers are asymmetrical, they create asymmetrical flow conditions; flow is faster along the angled side, resulting in increased pressure.

Horizontal liquid reducers are always eccentric, with the flat side on the top, which prevents the build up of air bubbles in the system, (unless on control set, same as PV, TV, HV, LV) or in a pipe rack. In a pipe rack, the flat side of an eccentric reducer is on the bottom, so that the position of the bottom of the pipe will be constant, and supported by the rack. Eccentric reducers are used at the suction side of pumps to ensure air does not accumulate in the pipe. The gradual accumulation of air in a concentric reducer could result in a large bubble that could eventually cause the pump to stall or cause cavitation when drawn into the pump. Eccentric reducers exhibit a unique design with one side having a larger diameter and the other side being smaller and offset from the centerline. This offset configuration enables the eccentric reducer to maintain a consistent fluid level within the piping system, preventing air or gas accumulation.

Horizontal gas reducers are always eccentric, bottom flat, which allows condensed water or oil to drain at low points.

Reducers in vertical lines are generally concentric unless the layout dictates otherwise.

== See also ==
- Reducer
- Rotodynamic pump
