= Plumber's snake =

Tool to dislodge clogs in plumbing

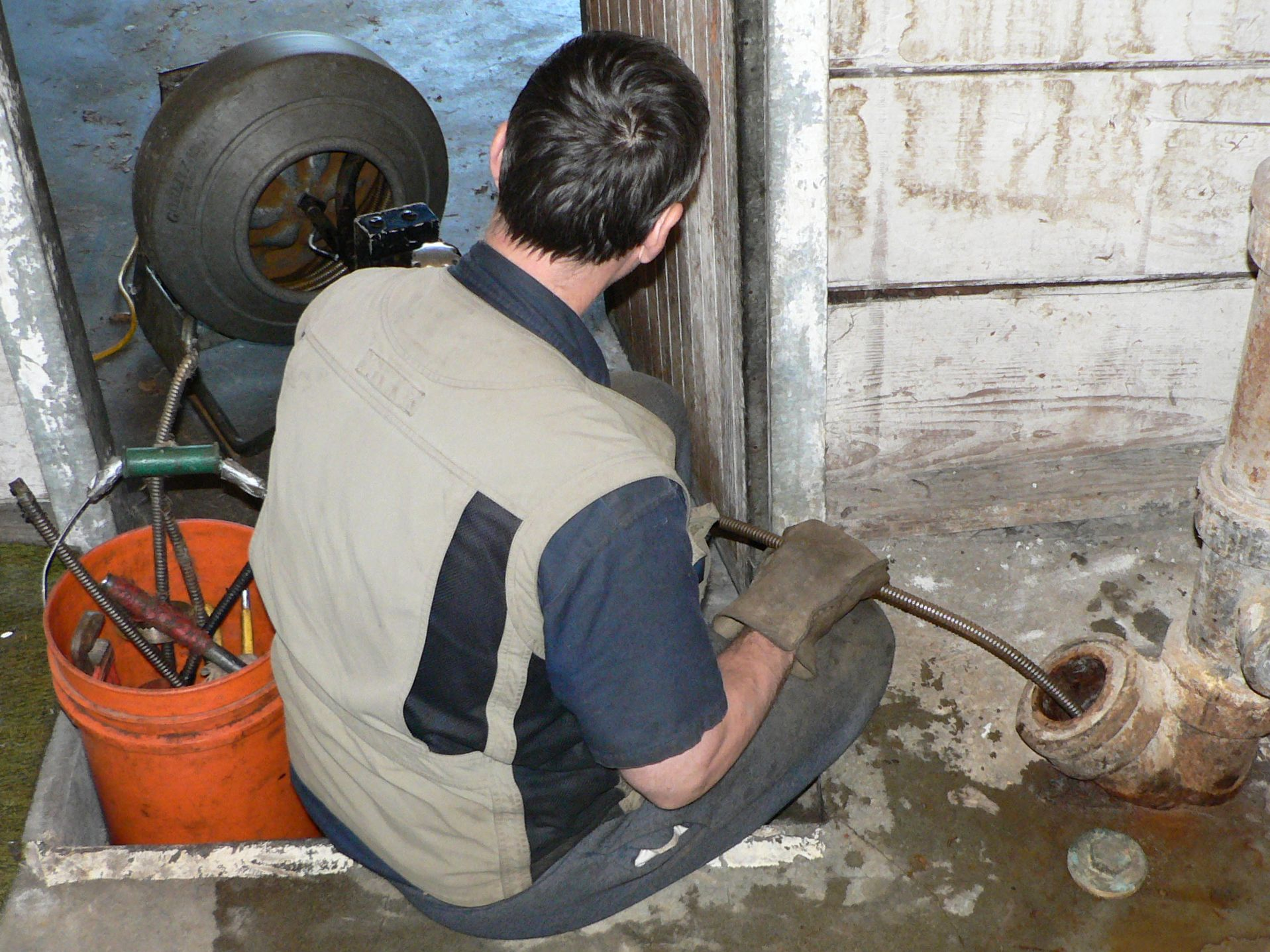
A man clears a sanitary sewer pipe with a motorized snake.

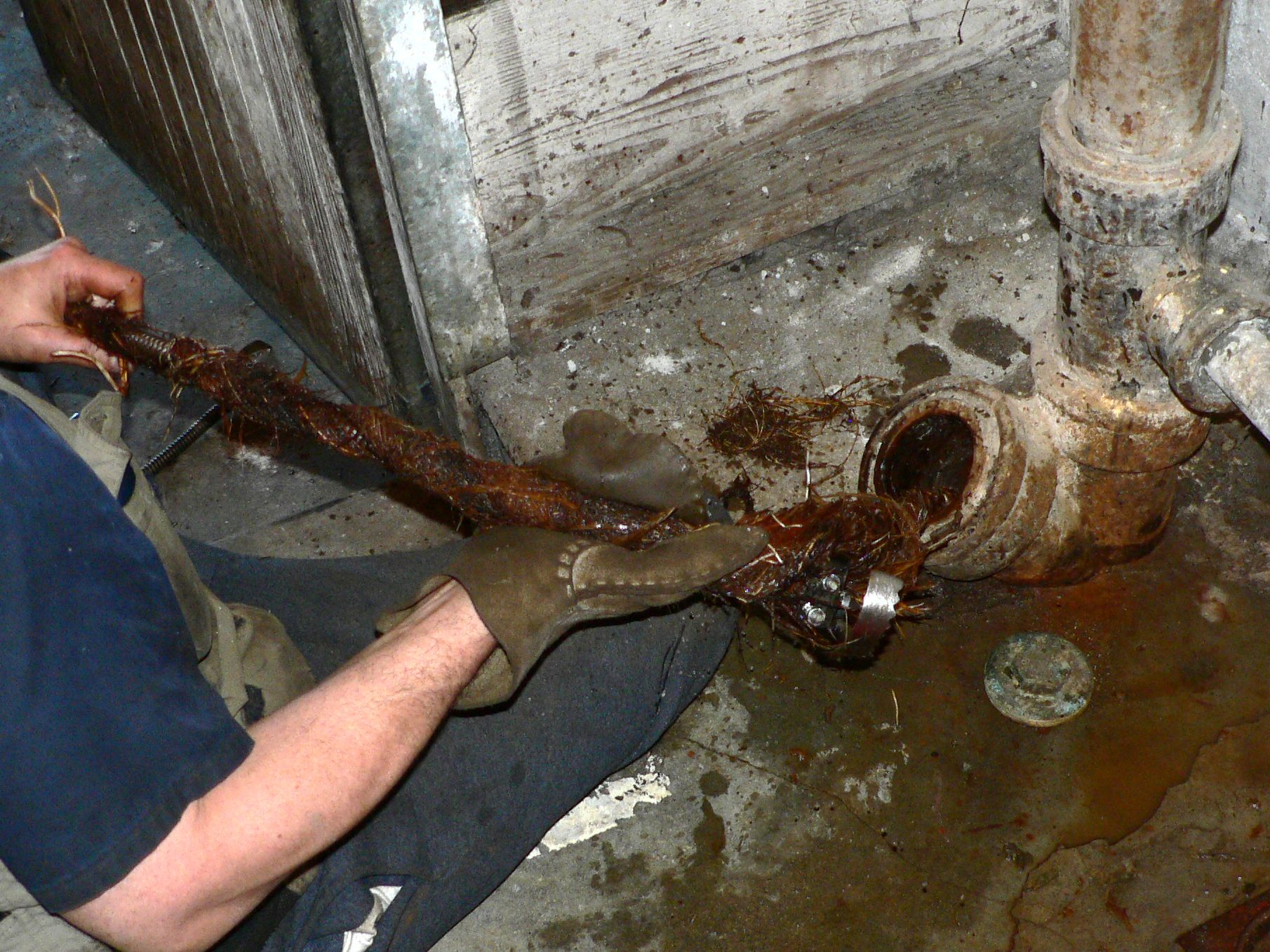
Plant roots and other material being removed from a drain

A plumber's snake or drain snake or drain auger is a slender, flexible auger used to dislodge clogs in plumbing. The plumber's snake is often reserved for difficult clogs that cannot be loosened with a plunger. It is also sometimes called a toilet jack. A plumber's snake is often used by plumbers to clear a clogged drain pipe or sanitary sewer.

== Auger varieties ==
Plumber's snakes have a coiled (helix-shaped) metal wire with a broader gap between the coils at the terminal end. The operator turns a crank to rotate the helix as it moves through the pipe.

If the clog is caused by a dense, but shreddable obstacle, such as tree roots or glass wool, the auger might break it up enough to enable flow. A small, lightweight obstruction might be snagged or corkscrewed by the auger, enabling the operator to pull it away. As the auger cable rotates, it also flails against the interior walls of the pipe, scraping off minerals and oil.

=== Hand auger / hand spinner ===
Hand augers are useful for clearing sink and bathtub drains. They are unsuitable for sending through flush toilets, because the wire might damage the bowl; also, flush toilets have relatively large drain channels in which the narrow snake can become tangled. (A 1/4-inch cable, for example, should never be used in a drain with a calibre of more than two inches.)

=== Closet auger / toilet auger ===
The closet auger (named after water closet) feeds a relatively short auger through a hook-shaped length of metal tubing. The hook shape makes it easier to feed the auger into the toilet. A plastic or rubber boot on the end of the rigid tubing protects the finish of the visible porcelain. Since most toilet clogs occur in the trap built into the bowl, the short cable is sufficient to break up or retrieve the majority of clogs.

=== Drum augers ===
A drum auger is a motorized auger with modular blades designed for various gauges of pipe. A drum auger is powerful enough to cut through tree roots. Used unskillfully, they can also damage plastic pipework and even copper tubing.

=== Roto-Rooter ===
The Roto-Rooter is an electric auger invented in 1933 by Samuel Blanc, an American. His wife named the invention, because the cable and blades rotated as they cut through tree roots inside sewer pipe. Competing companies made imitations after Blanc's patent expired in 1953, but the namesake machine is manufactured by and for a US company called the Roto-Rooter Plumbing & Drain Service.

== Gallery ==
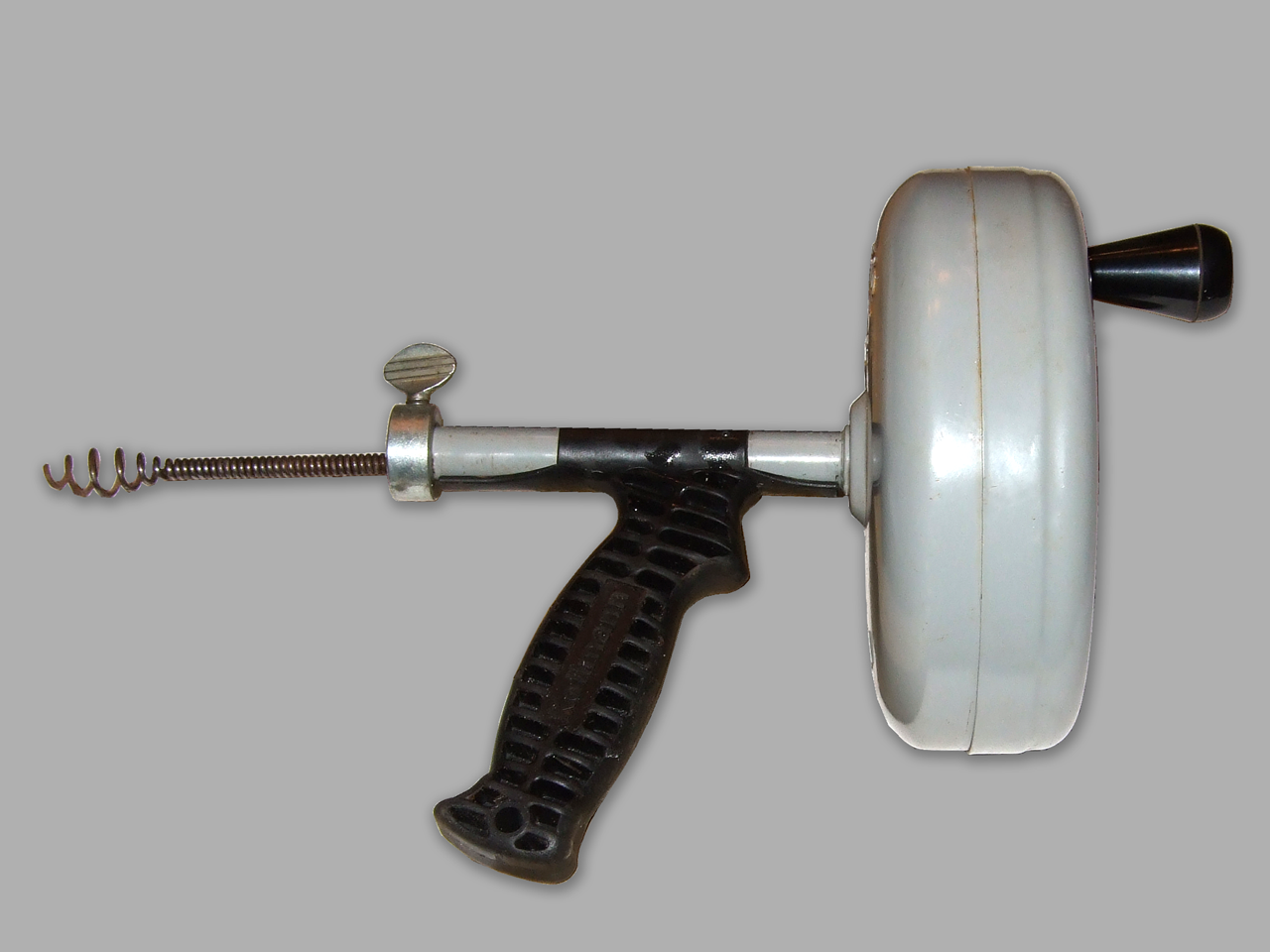
Hand auger

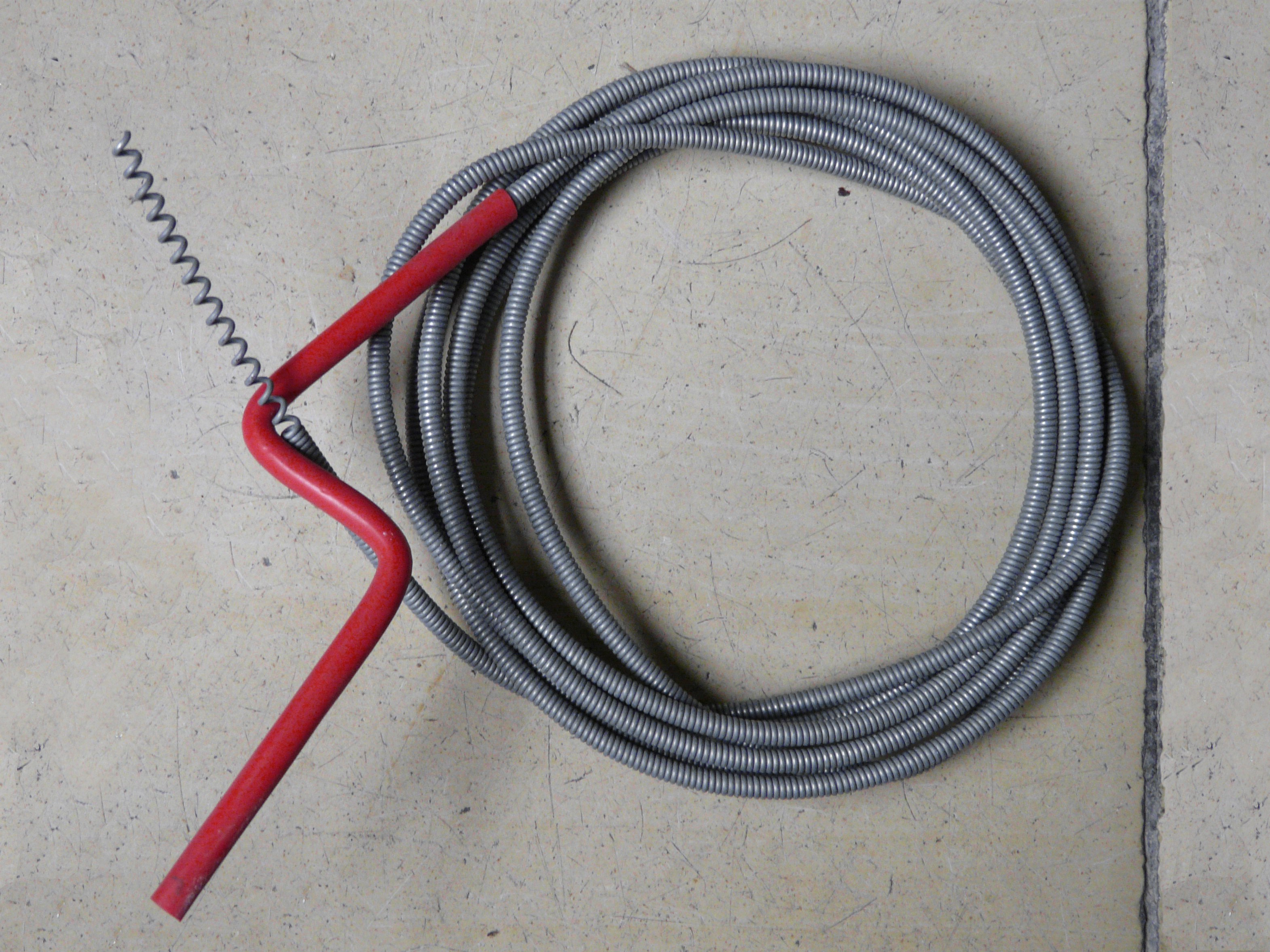
Simple auger lacking a case

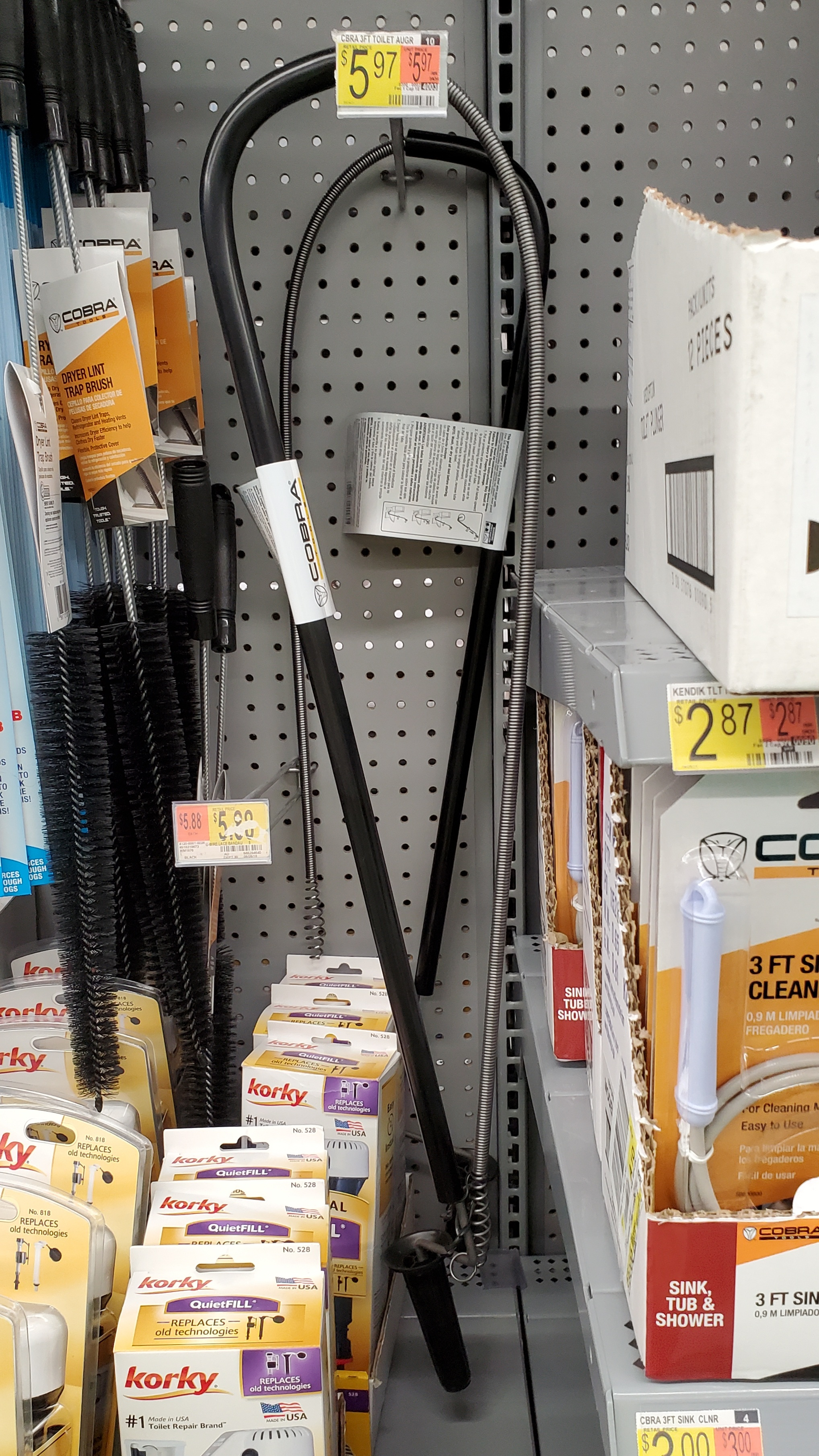
Toilet snake

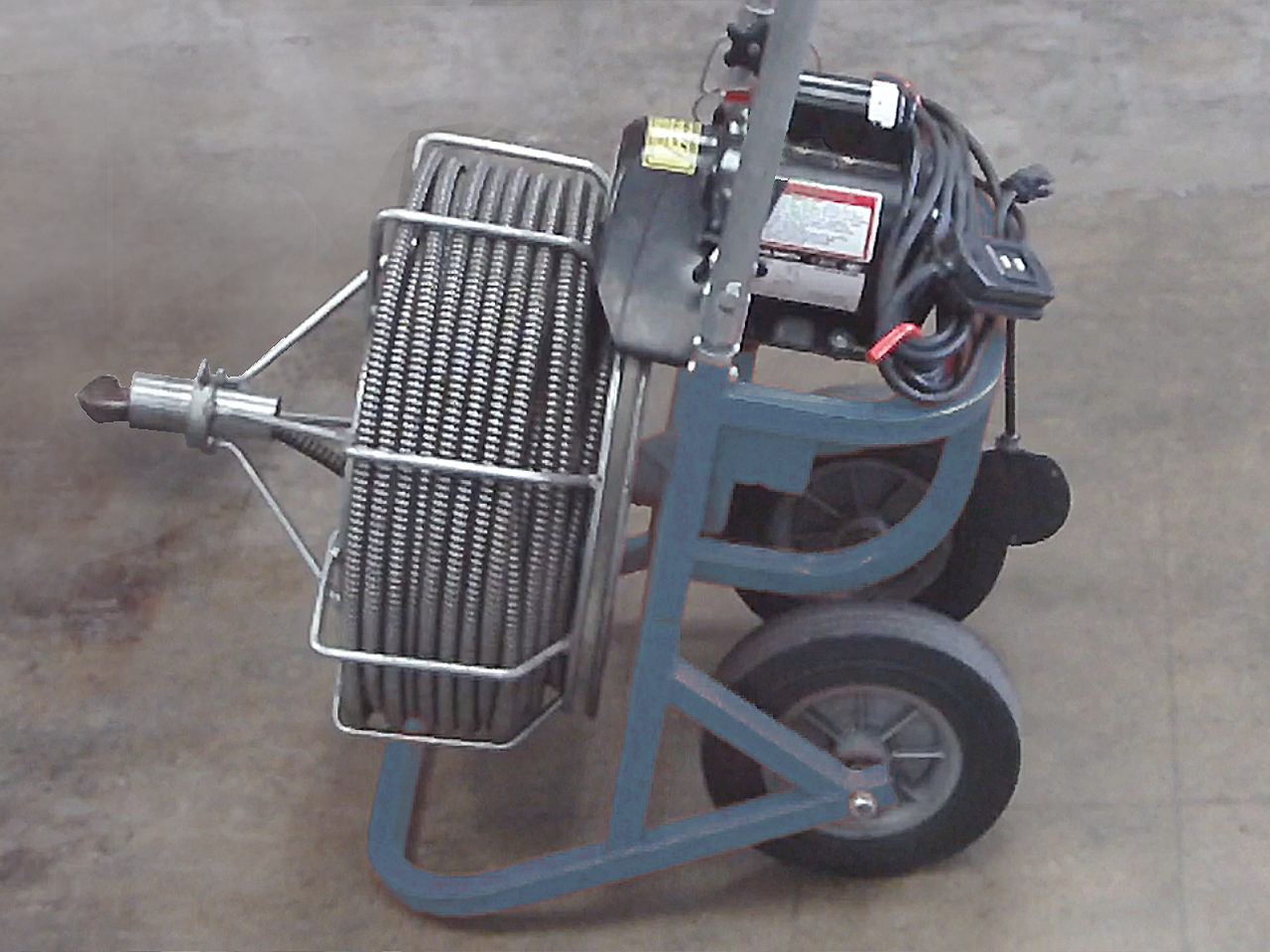
Drum auger
