= Piping and plumbing fitting =

Connecting pieces in pipe systems

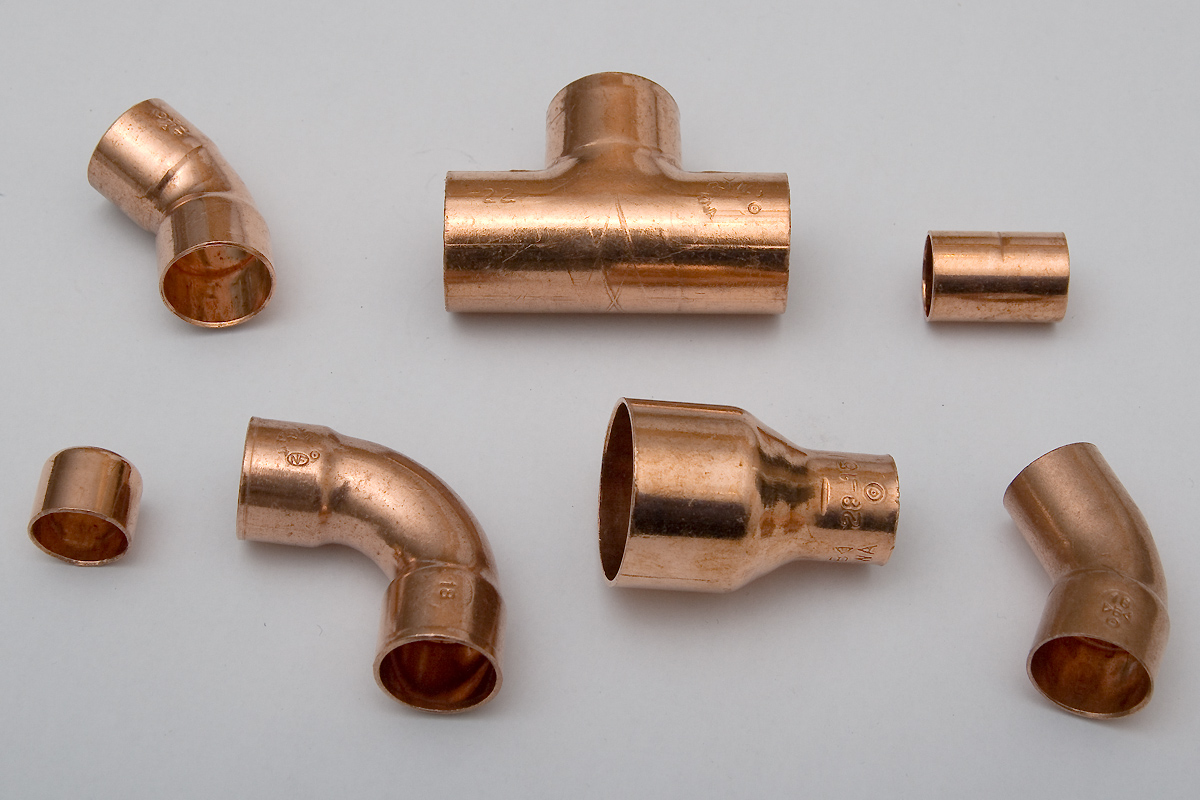
Copper fittings for soldered joints

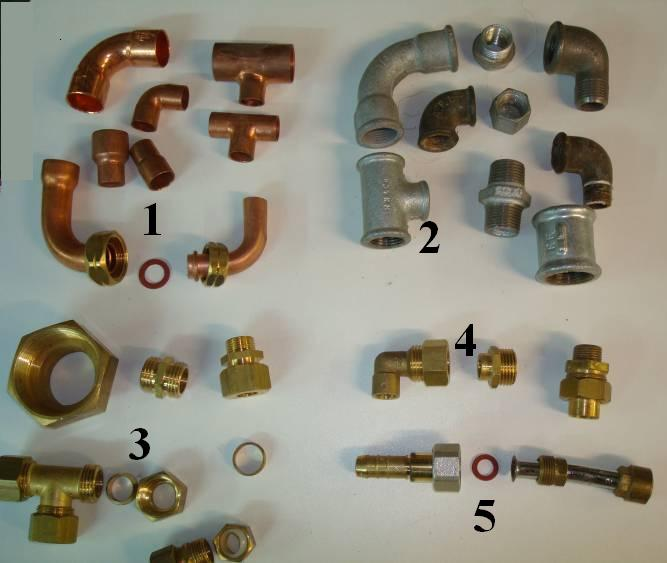
Pipe fittings: 1) Copper (solder); 2) Iron or brass (threaded); 3) Brass (compression); 4) Brass (compression to solder); 5) Brass adapters

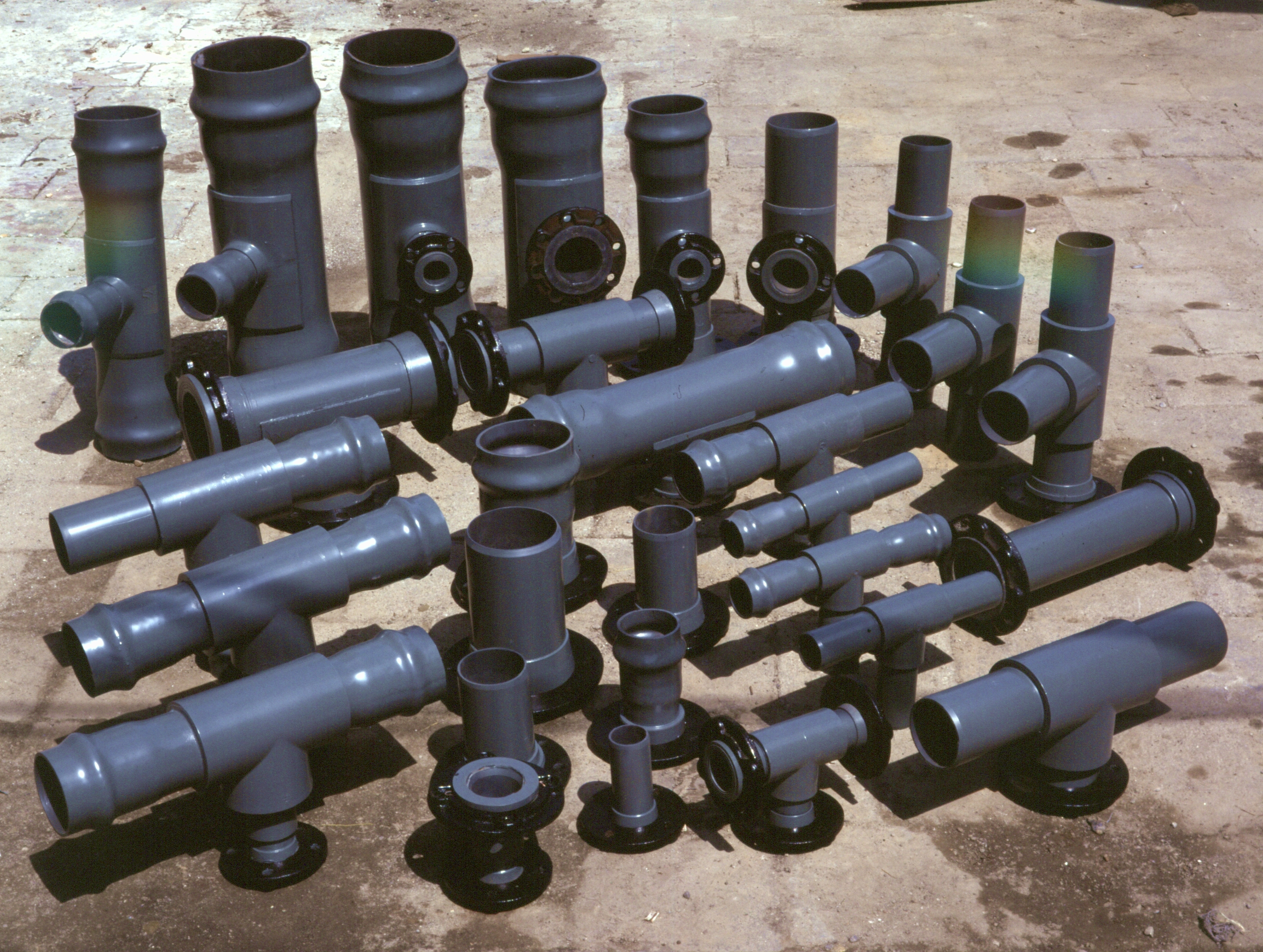
PVC fittings

A fitting or adapter is used in pipe systems to connect sections of pipe (designated by nominal size, with greater tolerances of variance) or tube (designated by actual size, with lower tolerance for variance), adapt to different sizes or shapes, and for other purposes such as regulating (or measuring) fluid flow. These fittings can manipulate the conveyance of fluids such as water for potatory, irrigational, sanitary, and refrigerative purposes, or other liquids like gas, petroleum, and liquid waste.

Fittings allow multiple pipes to be connected to cover longer distances, increase or decrease the size of the pipe or tube, or extend a network by branching, and make possible more complex systems than could be achieved with only individual pipes. Valves are specialized fittings that permit regulating the flow of fluid within a plumbing system.

== Standards ==
Standard codes are followed when designing (or manufacturing) a piping system. Organizations which promulgate piping standards include:

- ASME: American Society of Mechanical Engineers
  - A112.19.1 Enameled cast-iron and steel plumbing fixtures standards
  - A112.19.2 Ceramic plumbing fixtures standard
- ASTM International: American Society for Testing and Materials
- API: American Petroleum Institute
- AWS: American Welding Society
- AWWA: American Water Works Association
- MSS: Manufacturers Standardization Society
- ANSI: American National Standards Institute
- NFPA: National Fire Protection Association
- EJMA: Expansion Joint Manufacturers Association
- CGA: Compressed Gas Association
- PCA: Plumbing Code of Australia

Pipes must conform to the dimensional requirements of:

- ASME B36.10M: Welded and seamless wrought-steel pipe
- ASME B36.19M: Stainless-steel pipe
- ASME B31.3 2008: Process piping
- ASME B31.4 XXXX: Power piping

== Materials ==
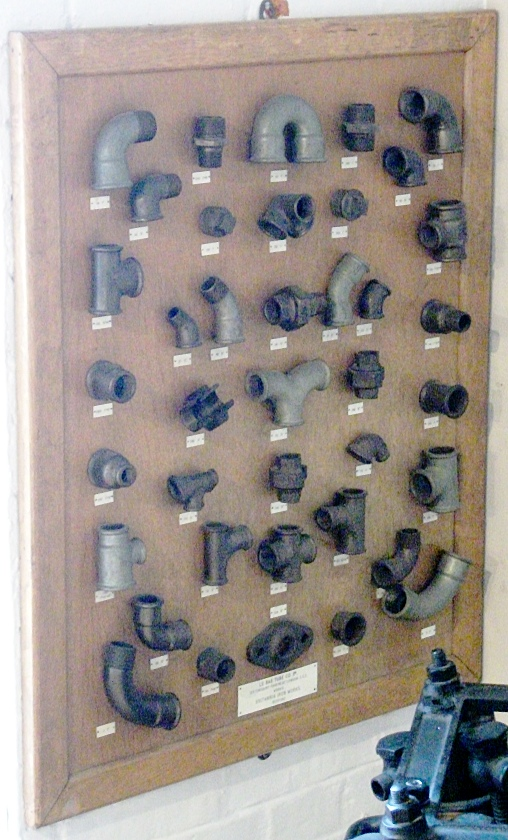
Display of threaded cast-iron fittings

The material with which a pipe is manufactured is often the basis for choosing a pipe. Materials used for manufacturing pipes include:

- Carbon (CS) and galvanized steel
- Impact-tested carbon steel (ITCS)
- Low-temperature carbon steel (LTCS)
- Stainless steel (SS)
- Malleable iron
- Chrome-molybdenum (alloy) steel (generally used for high-temperature service)
- Non-ferrous metals (includes copper, inconel, incoloy, and cupronickel)
- Non-metallic (includes acrylonitrile butadiene styrene (ABS), fibre-reinforced plastic (FRP), polyvinyl chloride (PVC), chlorinated polyvinyl chloride (CPVC), high-density polyethylene (HDPE), Cross-linked polyethylene (PEX), and toughened glass; polybutylene has also been used, but is now banned in North America because of poor reliability)

The bodies of fittings for pipe and tubing are often the same base material as the pipe or tubing connected: copper, steel, PVC, CPVC, or ABS. Any material permitted by the plumbing, health, or building code (as applicable) may be used, but it must be compatible with the other materials in the system, the fluids being transported, and the temperature and pressure inside (and outside) the system. Brass or bronze fittings are common in copper piping and plumbing systems. Fire resistance, earthquake resistance, mechanical ruggedness, theft resistance, and other factors also influence the choice of pipe and fitting materials.

== Gaskets ==
Gaskets are mechanical seals, usually ring-shaped, which seal flange joints. Gaskets vary by construction, materials and features. Commonly used gaskets are non-metallic (ASME B 16.21), spiral-wound (ASME B 16.20) and ring-joint (ASME B 16.20). Non-metallic gaskets are used with flat- or raised-face flanges. Spiral-wound gaskets are used with raised-face flanges, and ring-joint gaskets are used with ring-type joint (RTJ) flanges. Stress develops between an RTJ gasket and the flange groove when the gasket is bolted to a flange, leading to plastic deformation of the gasket.

== Gender ==
Piping or tubing is usually inserted into fittings to make connections. Connectors are assigned a gender, abbreviated M or F. An example of this is a "3/4-inch female adapter NPT", which would have a corresponding male connection of the same size and thread standard (in this case also NPT).

== Common piping and plumbing fittings ==
This section discusses fittings primarily used in pressurized piping systems, though there is some overlap with fittings for low-pressure or non-pressurized systems. Specialized fittings for the latter setups are discussed in the next major subsection.

=== Adapter ===
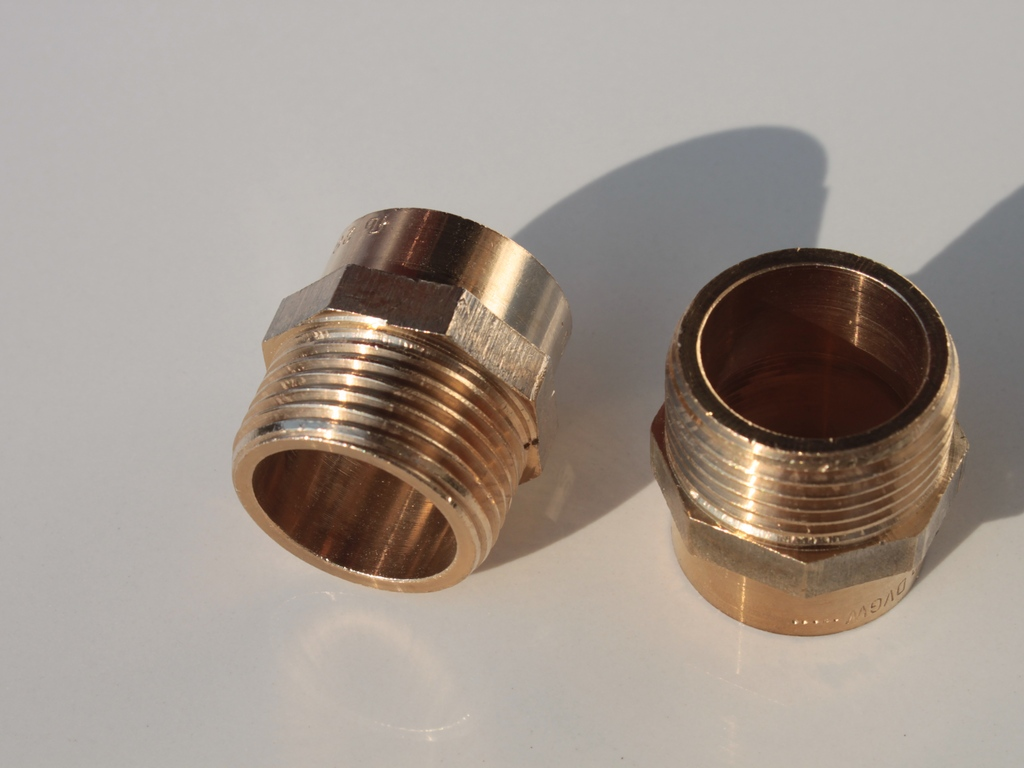
Two threaded adapters for connecting copper pipe (sweat) to a female thread

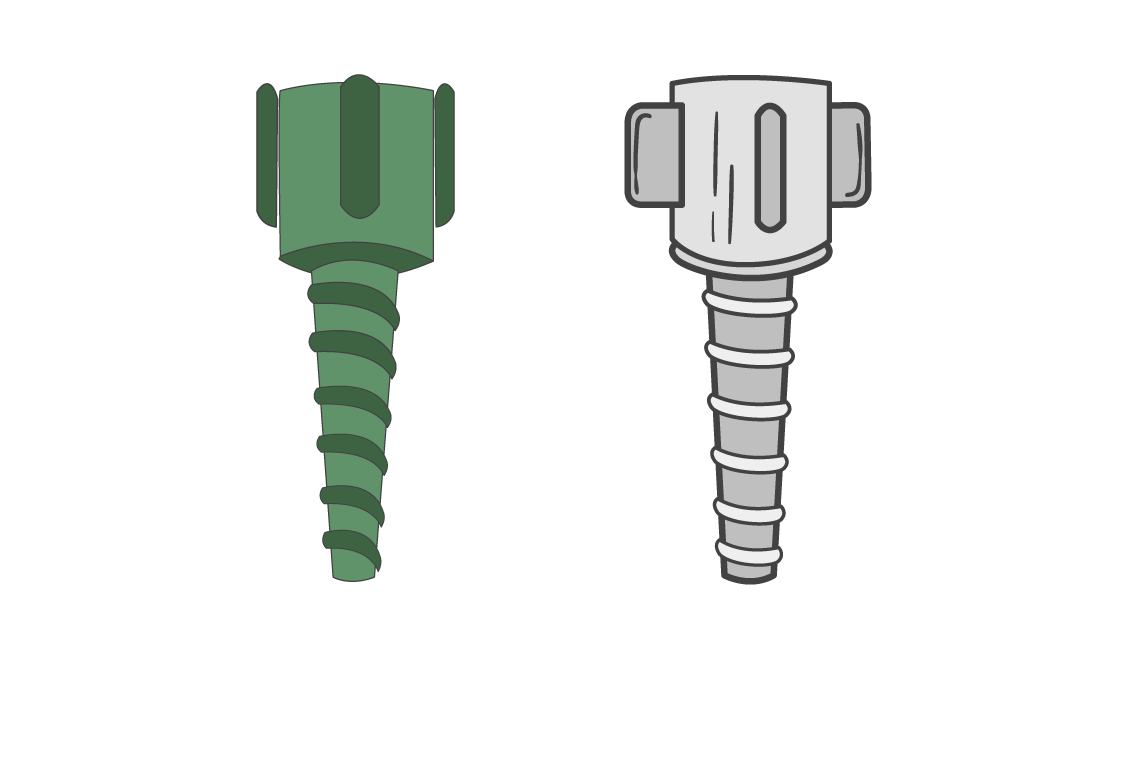
Tapered barbed adapter used for oxygen devices

In plumbing, an adapter is generally a fitting that interfaces two different parts. The term commonly refers to:

- any fitting that connects pipes of different materials, including:
  - expansion adapters which have a flexible section to absorb expansion or contraction from two dissimilar pipe materials
  - mechanical joint (MJ) adapters for joining polyethylene pipe to another material
  - bell adapters which are like mechanical joint adapters but contain a stainless steel backup ring to maintain a positive seal against the mating flange
  - flange adapters which attach to a polyethylene pipe with butt fusion to stiffen a junction and allow another flanged pipe or fitting to be bolted on
- a fitting that connects pipes of different diameters, genders, or threads
  - adapter spools (also called crossover spools), used on oilfields and pressure control, have different diameters, pressure ratings or designs at each end
  - adapters to convert NPT to BSP pipe threads are available
- a fitting that connects threaded and non-threaded pipe

=== Elbow ===
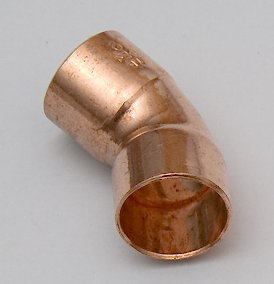
Short-radius (or regular) 45° elbow (copper sweat)

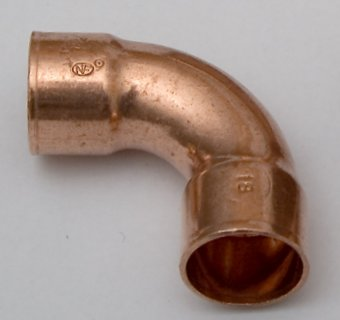
Long-radius (or sweep) 90° elbow (copper sweat)

An elbow is installed between two lengths of pipe (or tubing) to allow a change of direction, usually a 90° or 45° angle; 22.5° elbows are also available. The ends may be machined for butt welding, threaded (usually female), or socketed. When the ends differ in size, it is known as a reducing (or reducer) elbow.

Clarity on the difference between plumbing terminologies and geometric angles:

In plumbing, the term "45-degree elbow" for example, refers to the angle of bend from the original straight pipe position (0 degrees) to the new position (45 degrees), not the actual angle formed by the joint.

On a protractor, the actual angle of the above joint is 135 degrees, an obtuse angle.

This naming convention applies to other plumbing elbows, such as:

- "88 degree elbow" = 92 degrees on a protractor. Visualise bending the left end of the pipe up 88 degrees. Now turn the piece of pipe around so the horizontal piece of pipe is in line with the zero degrees line on the protractor. The protractor will read 92 degrees.

The key point is that the plumbing term focuses on the degree of bend from the original straight pipe, not the resulting angle.

Elbows are also categorized by length. The radius of curvature of a long-radius (LR) elbow is 1.5 times the pipe diameter, but a short-radius (SR) elbow has a radius equal to the pipe diameter. Wide available short elbows are typically used in pressurized systems and physically tight locations.

Long elbows are used in low-pressure gravity-fed systems and other applications where low turbulence and minimum deposition of entrained solids are of concern. They are available in acrylonitrile butadiene styrene (ABS plastic), polyvinyl chloride (PVC), chlorinated polyvinyl chloride (CPVC), and copper, and are used in DWV systems, sewage, and central vacuum systems.

=== Coupling ===
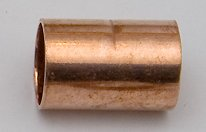
Pipe coupling (copper sweat)

A coupling connects two pipes. The fitting is known as a reducing coupling, reducer, or adapter if their sizes differ. There are two types of collars: "regular" and "slip". A regular coupling has a small ridge or stops internally to prevent the over-insertion of a pipe and, thus, under-insertion of the other pipe segment (which would result in an unreliable connection).

A slip coupling (sometimes also called a repair coupling) is deliberately made without this internal stop to allow it to be slipped into place in tight locations, such as the repair of a pipe that has a small leak due to corrosion or freeze bursting, or which had to be cut temporarily for some reason. Since the alignment stop is missing, it is up to the installer to carefully measure the final location of the slip coupling to ensure that it is located correctly.

=== Union ===
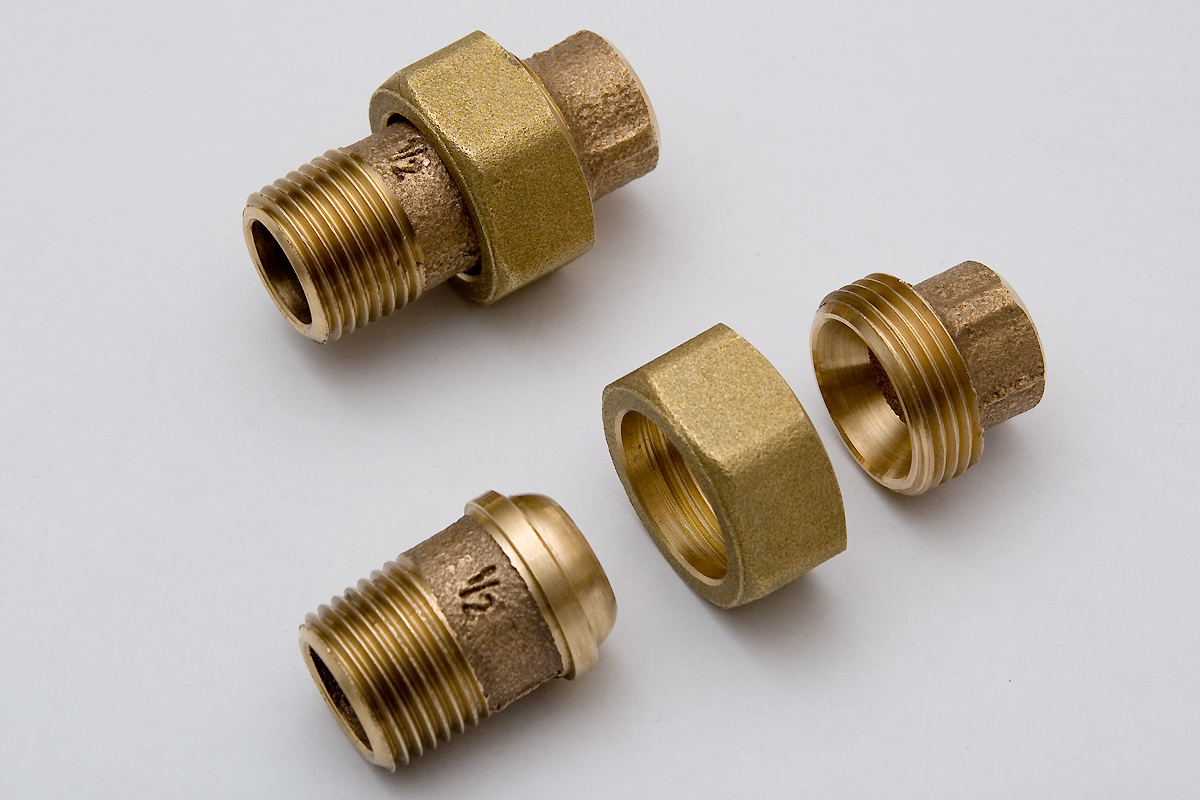
Combination union and reducer (brass threaded)

A union also connects two pipes but is quite different from a coupling, as it allows future disconnection of the pipes for maintenance. In contrast to a coupling requiring solvent welding, soldering, or rotation (for threaded couplings), a union allows easy connection and disconnection multiple times if needed. It consists of three parts: a nut, a female, and a male end. When the female and male ends are joined, the nut seals the joint by pressing the two ends tightly together. Unions are a type of very compact flange connector.

Dielectric unions, with dielectric insulation, separate dissimilar metals (such as copper and galvanized steel) to prevent galvanic corrosion. When two dissimilar metals are in contact with an electrically conductive solution (ordinary tap water is conductive), they form an electrochemical couple which generates a voltage by electrolysis. When the metals are in direct contact with each other, the electric current from one to the other also moves metallic ions from one to the other; this dissolves one metal, depositing it on the other. A dielectric union breaks the electrical path with a plastic liner between its halves, limiting galvanic corrosion.

Rotary unions allow mechanical rotation of one of the joined parts while resisting leakage.

=== Nipple ===
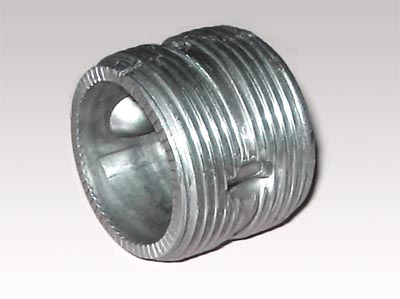
Nipple

A nipple is a short stub of pipe, usually male-threaded steel, brass, chlorinated polyvinyl chloride (CPVC), or copper (occasionally unthreaded copper), which connects two other fittings. A nipple with continuous uninterrupted threading is known as a close nipple. Nipples are commonly used with plumbing and hoses.

=== Reducer ===
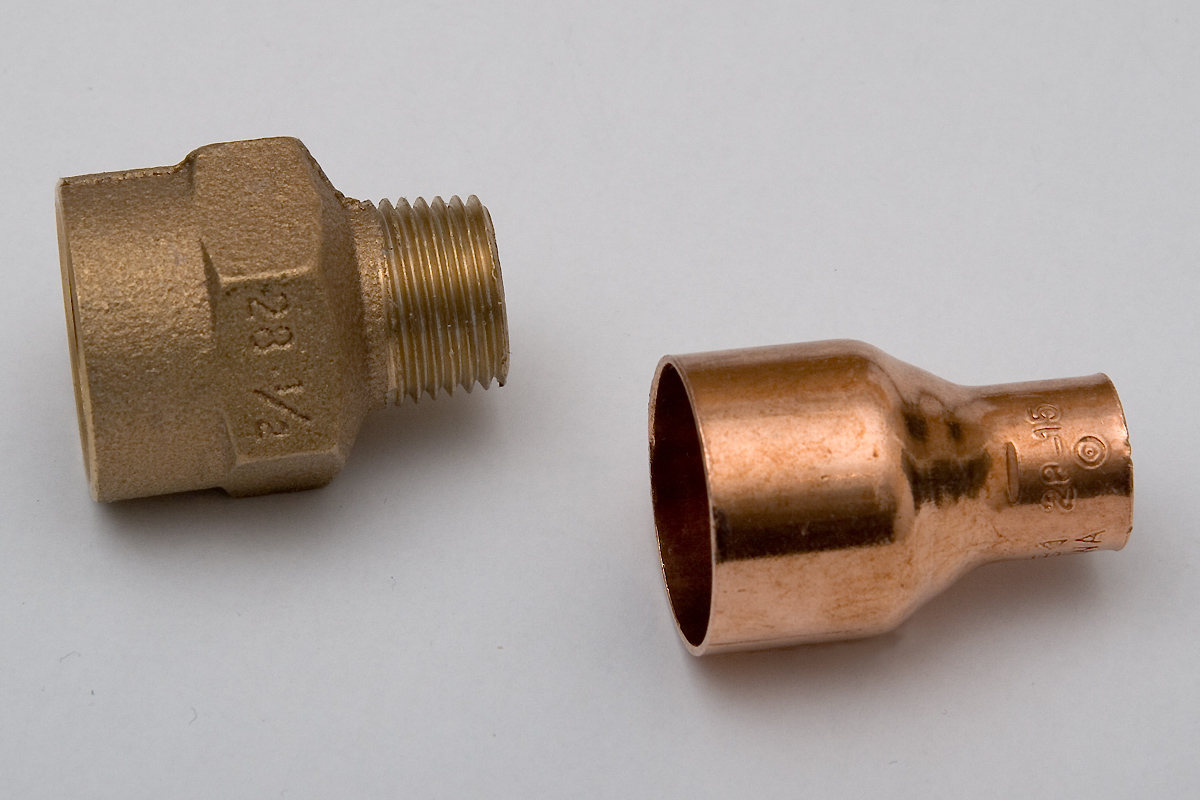
Bronze threaded (at left) and copper sweat (at right) reducers

A reducer reduces the pipe size from a larger to a smaller bore (inner diameter). Alternatively, reducer may refer to any fitting which causes a change in pipe diameter. This change may be intended to meet hydraulic flow requirements of the system or adapt to existing piping of a different size. The reduction length is usually equal to the average of the larger and smaller pipe diameters. Although reducers are usually concentric, eccentric reducers are used as needed to maintain the top- or bottom-of-pipe level.

A reducer can also be used either as a nozzle or diffuser, depending on the mach number of the flow.

=== Bushing ===
A double-tapped bushing, commonly shortened to bushing, is a fitting which serves as a reducer. It is a sleeve similar to a close nipple, but is threaded on both its inner and outer circumferences. Like a reducer, a double-tapped bushing has two threads of different sizes. A common type of this style fitting is a "hex bushing" with a hex head for installation with a pipe wrench.

A double-tapped bushing is more compact than a reducer but not as flexible. While a double-tapped bushing has a more minor female thread concentric to a larger male thread (and thus couples a smaller male end to a larger female), a reducer may have large and small ends of either gender. If both ends are the same gender, it is a gender-changing reducer.

There are similar fittings for both sweat and solvent joinery. Since they are not "tapped" (threaded), they are simply called reducing bushings.

=== Tee ===
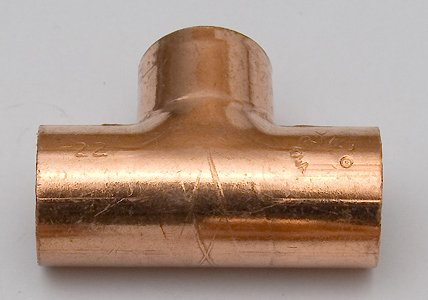
Copper sweat tee

A tee combines or divides fluid flow. Tees can connect pipes of different diameters, change the direction of a pipe run, or both. Available in various materials, sizes and finishes, they may also be used to transport two-fluid mixtures. Tees may be equal or unequal in size of their three connections, with equal tees the most common.

=== Diverter tee ===
This specialized type of tee fitting is used primarily in pressurized hydronic heating systems to divert a portion of the flow from the main line into a side branch connected to a radiator or heat exchanger. The diverter tee allows the flow in the main line, even when the side branch is shut down and not calling for heat. Diverter tees must be heeded with directional markings; a tee installed backwards will function very poorly.

=== Cross ===
Crosses, also known as four-way fittings or cross branch lines, have one inlet and three outlets (or vice versa), and often have solvent-welded sockets or female-threaded ends. Cross fittings may stress pipes as temperatures change because they are at the center of four connection points. A tee is steadier than a cross; it behaves like a three-legged stool, and a cross behaves like a four-legged stool. Geometrically, any three non-collinear points can self-consistently define a plane; three legs are inherently stable, whereas four points overdetermine a plane and can be inconsistent, resulting in physical stress on a fitting.

Crosses are common in fire sprinkler systems (where stress caused by thermal expansion is not generally an issue), but are not common in plumbing.

=== Cap ===
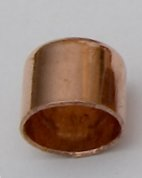
Copper sweat cap

Caps, usually liquid- or gas-tight, cover the otherwise open end of a pipe. The exterior of an industrial cap may be round, square, rectangular, U- or I-shaped, or may have a handgrip.

=== Plug ===
A plug is a short barbed fitting with a blank end that can only be used with PEX piping to end the continuation of a water line that is no longer in use due to tying in elsewhere within the system or to seal the end of a water line which may be used for future use in the case of additional facilities. All plugs are sealed watertight with a PEX crimp.

=== Barb ===
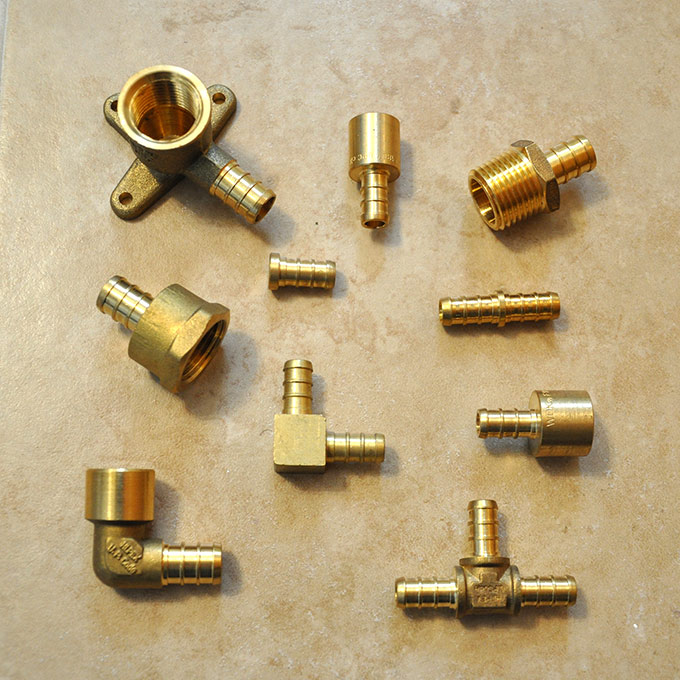
These brass fittings for PEX tubing are very similar to, but not necessarily interchangeable with hose barbs

A barb (or hose barb), which connects flexible hose or tubing to pipes, typically has a male-threaded end which mates with female threads. The other end of the fitting has a single- or multi-barbed tube—a long tapered cone with ridges, which is inserted into a flexible hose.

=== Valve ===
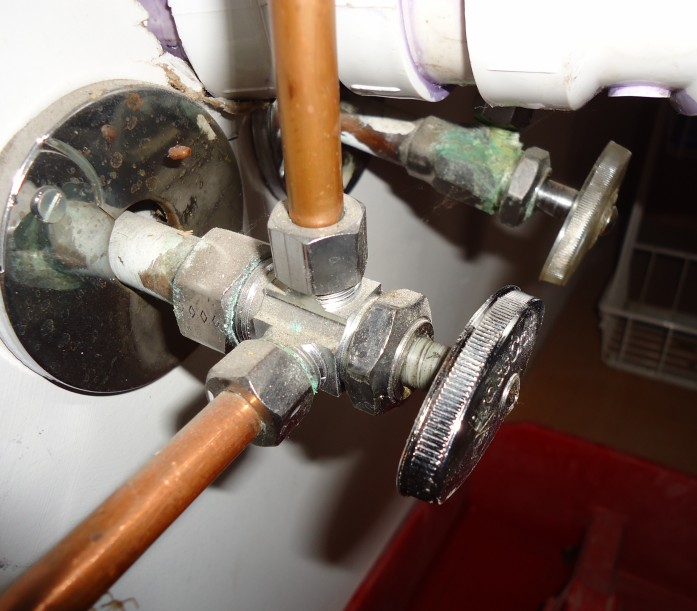
These compression connections on water shutoff valves under a kitchen sink show evidence of slow seepage (greenish deposits).

Valves stop (or regulate) the flow of liquids or gases. They are categorized by application, such as isolation, throttling, and non-return.

Isolation valves temporarily disconnect part of a piping system to allow maintenance or repair, for example. Isolation valves are typically left in either a fully open or closed position. A given isolation valve may be in place for many years without being operated but must be designed to be readily operable whenever needed, including for emergency use.

Throttling valves control the amount or pressure of a fluid allowed to pass through and are designed to withstand the stress and wear caused by this operation. Because they may wear out in this usage, they are often installed alongside isolation valves which can temporarily disconnect a failing throttling valve from the rest of the system, so it can be refurbished or replaced.

Non-return or check valves allow the free flow of a fluid in one direction but prevent its flow in a reverse direction. They are often seen in drainage or sewage systems but may also be used in pressurized systems.

Valves are available in several types, based on design and purpose:

- Gate, plug, or ball valves – Isolation
- Globe valve – Throttling
- Needle valve – Throttling, usually with high precision but low flow
- Butterfly or diaphragm valves – Isolation and throttling
- Check valve – Preventing reverse flow (non-return)

== Drain-waste-vent (DWV) and related fittings ==
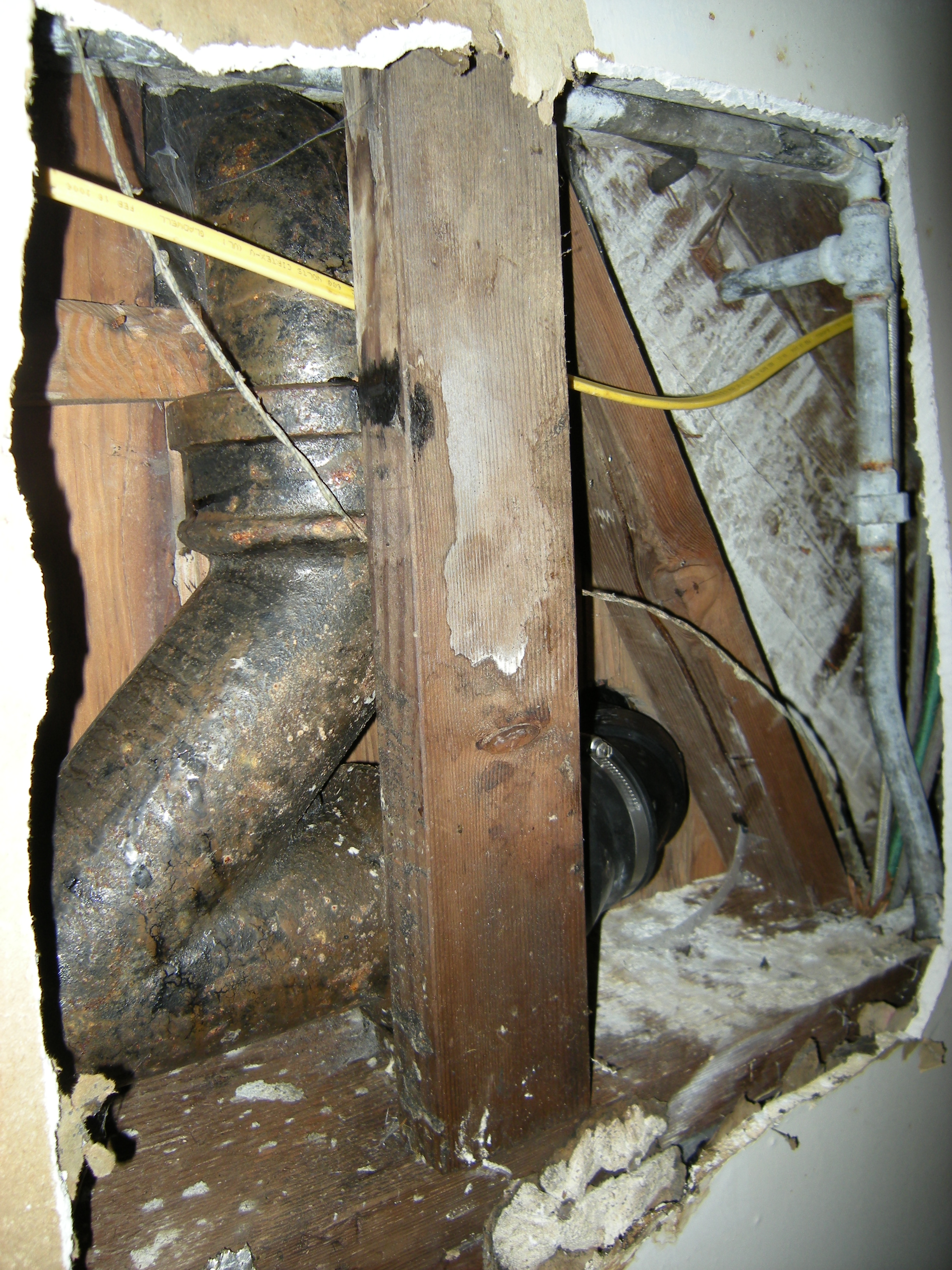
This view looking upwards through a hole in the ceiling shows a traditional leaded hub joint (at top) and a more recent rubber-sleeved hubless connection (at lower right).

Because they operate at low pressure and rely on gravity to move fluids (and entrained solids), drain-waste-vent systems use fittings whose interior surfaces are as smooth as possible. The fittings may be "belled" (expanded slightly in diameter) or otherwise shaped to accommodate the insertion of pipe or tubing without forming a sharp interior ridge that might catch debris or accumulate material, and cause a clog or blockage. Freshly cut ends of pipe segments are carefully deburred to remove projecting slivers of material which may snag debris (such as hair or fibers) which can build up to cause blockages. This internal smoothness also makes it easier to "snake out" or "rod out" a clogged pipe with a plumber's snake.

Underground piping systems for landscaping drainage or the disposal of stormwater or groundwater also use low-pressure gravity flow, so fittings for these systems resemble larger-scale DWV fittings. With high peak-flow volumes, the design and construction of these systems may resemble those of storm sewers.

Fittings for central vacuum systems are similar to DWV fittings but usually have thinner and lighter construction because the weight of the materials conveyed is less. Vacuum-system designs share with DWV designs the need to eliminate internal ridges, burrs, sharp turns, or other obstructions which might create clogs.

=== Slip-joint fitting ===
Slip-joint fittings are frequently used in kitchen, bathroom and tub drainage systems. They include a detached (movable) slip nut and slip-joint washer; the washer is made of rubber or nylon. An advantage of this type of fitting is that the pipe it is connecting to does not need to be cut to a precise length; the slip joint can attach within a range of the end of the inserting pipe. Many slip fittings may be tightened or loosened by hand for easier access to residential drainpipe systems (for example, to clean out a trap or access a drain line past a trap).

=== Sweep elbow ===
DWV elbows are usually long-radius ("sweep") types. To reduce flow resistance and solid deposits when the direction of flow is changed, they use a shallow curve with a large radius of curvature. In addition, a well-designed system will often use two 45° elbows instead of one 90° elbow (even a sweep 90° elbow) to reduce flow disruption as much as possible.

Central vacuum system inlet fittings are intentionally designed with a tighter curvature radius than other bends in the system. If vacuumed debris becomes stuck, it will jam at the inlet, where it is easy to find and remove.

=== Closet flange ===
A closet flange (the drainpipe flange to which a flush toilet is attached) is a specialized flange designed to be flush with the floor, allowing a toilet to be installed above it. The flange must be mechanically strong to accommodate slight misalignments or movements and resist corrosion.

=== Clean-out ===
Clean-outs are fittings with removable elements, allowing access to drains without removing plumbing fixtures. They are used to allow an auger (or plumber's snake) to clean out a plugged drain. Since clean-out augers are limited in length, clean-outs should be placed in accessible locations at regular intervals throughout a drainage system (including outside the building). Minimum requirements are typically at the end of each branch in piping, just ahead of each water closet, at the base of each vertical stack and inside and outside the building in the main drain or sewer. Clean-outs usually have screw-on caps or screw-in plugs. They are also known as "rodding eyes", because of the eye-shaped cover plates often used on external versions.

=== Trap primer ===
A trap primer automatically injects water into a trap, maintaining a water seal to keep sewer gas out of buildings. It must be installed in an easily accessible place for adjustment, replacement, and repair. A trap primer, a specialized valve, is usually connected to a clean-water supply in addition to a DWV system. Because of the dual connection, it must be designed to resist the accidental backflow of contaminated water.

=== Combo tee ===
A combination tee (combo tee, combo wye, tee-wye, long-sweep wye, or combi) is a tee with a gradually curving central connecting joint: a wye plus an additional 1/8 bend (45°), combined in one 90° unit. It is used in drains for a smooth, gradually curving path to reduce the likelihood of clogs, to ease the pushing of a plumber's snake through a drain system and to encourage water flow in the direction of the drain.

=== Sanitary tee ===
A sanitary tee has a curved center section. In drainage systems, it is primarily used to connect horizontal drains (including fixture trap arms) to vertical drains. The center connection is generally to the pipe leading to a trap (the trap arm). It must not connect a vertical drain to a horizontal drain because of the likelihood that solids will accumulate at the bottom of the junction and cause a blockage.

=== Baffle tee ===
Also called a tee with a diverter baffle, a waste tee or an end-outlet tee, it typically connects waste lines before they enter the trap and has a baffle to keep water from one waste pipe from entering the other at the connection.

=== Double sanitary tee (sanitary cross) ===
This fitting differs from a standard cross in that two ports have curved inlets. Although it has been used in the past for connecting the drains of back-to-back fixtures (such as back-to-back sinks), some current codes—including the 2006 Uniform Plumbing Code in the United States—prohibit the use of this fitting for that purpose and require a double-fixture fitting (double combination wye) to minimize wastewater from one side flowing into the other.

=== Wye (Y) or tee-wye (TY) ===
Tee-wyes are similar to tees, except for angling the branch line to reduce friction and turbulence. They are commonly used to attach a vertical drainpipe to a horizontal one, reducing the deposition of entrained solids at the junction. Wyes and combo wyes follow a long-sweep pattern relative to sanitary tees and other short-sweep bends, which have a smaller radius and require less space.

Wyes also have industrial applications. Although low-priced wyes are often spot-welded, industrial-strength wyes are flash-welded at each seam. In long-distance pipeline applications, a specialized wye is used to allow insertion of pigging to keep pipes clear and flowing.

=== Side inlet tee-wye (TY) ===
This fitting (also known as a "bungalow fitting" or a "cottage fitting") is a sanitary tee that allows two trap arms to be connected at the same level. A toilet is the main connection, with the option of a right or left-hand outlet to the 3" inlet with a choice of 1-1/2" or 2" in size. It is used to keep stack-vented fixtures high to the joist space and thus conserves the headroom in a basement. As the water closet must be the lowest fixture, the smaller side outlet (usually used to connect the bathtub trap arm) enters slightly above the larger connection.

== Hydraulic fittings ==
Hydraulic systems use high fluid pressure, such as the hydraulic actuators for bulldozers and backhoes. Their hydraulic fittings are designed and rated for much greater pressure than that experienced in general piping systems, and they are generally not compatible with those used in plumbing. Hydraulic fittings are designed and constructed to resist high-pressure leakage and sudden failure.

== Connection methods ==
Much of the work of installing a piping or plumbing system involves making leakproof, reliable connections, and most piping requires mechanical support against gravity and other forces (such as wind loads and earthquakes) which might disrupt an installation. Depending on the connection technology and application, basic skills may be sufficient, or specialized skills and professional licensure may be legally required.

=== Fasteners and supports ===
Fasteners join, or affix, two or more objects. Although they are usually used to attach pipe and fittings to mechanical supports in buildings, they do not connect the pipes. Fasteners commonly used with piping are a stud bolt with nuts (usually fully threaded, with two heavy, hexagonal nuts); a machine bolt and nut; or a powder-actuated tool (PAT) fastener (usually a nail or threaded stud, driven into concrete or masonry).

=== Threaded pipe ===
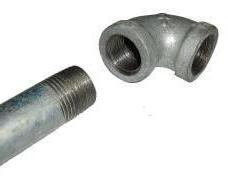
Male threaded pipe and female threaded elbow

A threaded pipe has a screw thread at one or both ends for assembly. Steel pipe is often joined with threaded connections; tapered threads are cut into the end of the pipe, and sealant is applied in the form of thread-sealing compound or thread seal tape (also known as PTFE or Teflon tape) and the pipe is screwed into a threaded fitting with a pipe wrench.

Threaded steel pipe is widely used in buildings to convey natural gas or propane fuel and is also a popular choice in fire sprinkler systems due to its resistance to mechanical damage and high heat (including the threaded joints). Threaded steel pipe may still be used in high-security or exposed locations because it is more resistant to vandalism, more difficult to remove, and its scrap value is much lower than copper or brass.

A galvanized coating of metallic zinc was often used to protect steel water pipes from corrosion, but this protective coating eventually would dissolve away, exposing the iron to deterioration. Pipes used to convey fuel gas are often made of "black iron", which has been chemically treated to reduce corrosion, but this treatment does not resist erosion from flowing water. Despite its ruggedness, steel pipe is no longer preferred for conveying drinking water because corrosion can eventually cause leakage (especially at threaded joints), deposits on internal surfaces will eventually restrict flow, and corrosion will shed black or rusty residues into the flowing water.

These disadvantages are less problematic for fire sprinkler installations because standing water in the steel pipes does not flow, except during occasional tests or activation by a fire. Introducing oxygen dissolved in freshwater supplies will cause some corrosion, but this soon stops without any source of additional water-borne oxygen.

In older installations, the threaded brass pipe was similarly used and was considered superior to steel for drinking water because it was more resistant to corrosion and shed much fewer residues into the flowing water.

Assembling threaded pipe is labor-intensive, and requires skill and planning to allow lengths of pipe to be screwed together in sequence. Most threaded-pipe systems require strategically located pipe-union fittings in final assembly. The threaded pipe is heavy and requires adequate attachment to support its weight.

To ensure a comprehensive pressure test, it is crucial to explicitly request a 3.1 certificate in accordance with EN HFF 10204:2004. This certificate attests that the 'metallic products' meet the stipulated order requirements and provides detailed test results. Typically, each fitting is associated with a unique heat number, which corresponds to the information documented in the 3.1 certificate datasheet.

=== Solvent welding ===
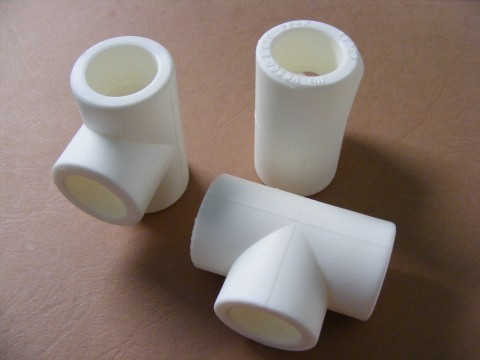
Polypropylene fittings for solvent welding

A solvent is applied to PVC, CPVC, ABS or other plastic piping to partially dissolve and fuse the adjacent surfaces of piping and fitting. Solvent welding is usually used with a sleeve-type joint to connect pipe and fittings made of the same (or compatible) material.

Unlike metal welding, solvent welding is relatively easy to perform (although care is needed to make reliable joints). Solvents typically used for plastics are usually toxic and may be carcinogenic and flammable, requiring adequate ventilation.

=== Soldering ===
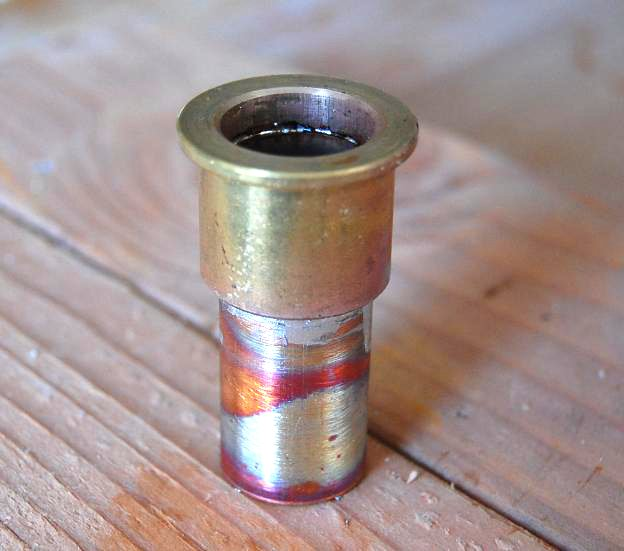
Brass fitting soft-soldered to copper pipe

To make a solder connection, a chemical flux is applied to the inner sleeve of a joint and the pipe is inserted. The joint is then heated, typically by using a propane or MAPP gas torch, although electrically heated soldering tools are sometimes used. Once the fitting and pipe have reached sufficient temperature, solder is applied to the heated joint, and the molten solder is drawn into the joint by capillary action as the flux vaporizes. "Sweating" is a term sometimes used to describe the soldering of pipe joints.

Where many connections must be made in a short period (such as plumbing of a new building), soldering is quicker and less expensive joinery than compression or flare fittings. A degree of skill is needed to make several reliable soldered joints quickly. If flux residue is thoroughly cleaned, soldering can produce a long-lasting connection at a low cost. However, using an open flame for heating joints can present fire and health hazards to building occupants and requires adequate ventilation.

=== Welding ===
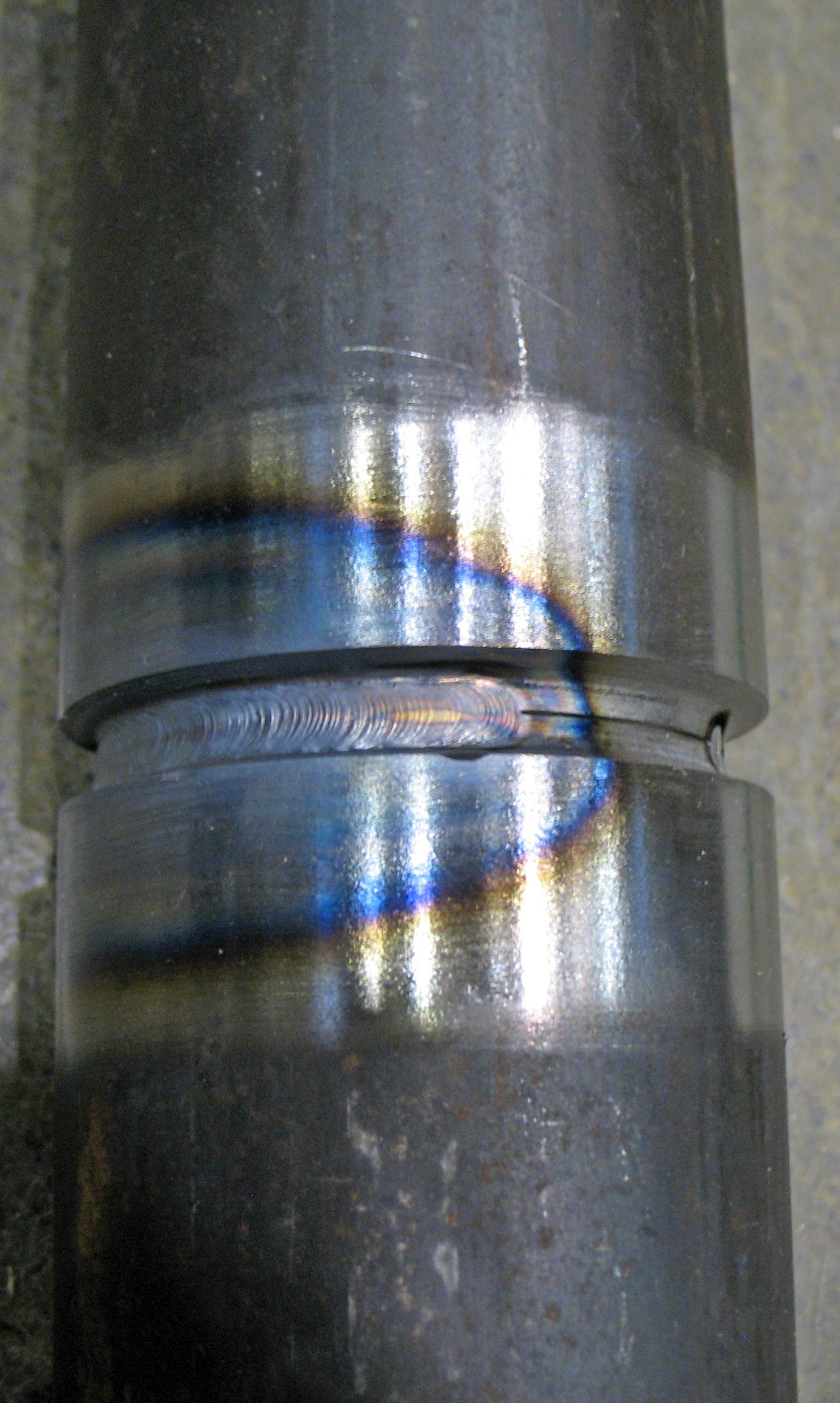
Partially-welded steel pipe joint

The welding of metals differs from soldering and brazing in that the joint is made without adding a lower-melting-point material (e.g. solder); instead, the pipe or tubing material is partially melted, and the fitting and piping are directly fused. This generally requires piping and fitting to be the same (or compatible) material. Skill is required to melt the joint sufficiently to ensure good fusion while not deforming or damaging the joined pieces.

Properly welded joints are considered reliable and durable. Pipe welding is often performed by specially licensed workers whose skills are retested periodically. For critical applications, every joint is tested with nondestructive methods. Because of the skills required, welded pipe joints are usually restricted to high-performance applications such as shipbuilding, and in chemical and nuclear reactors.

Adequate ventilation is essential to remove metal fumes from welding operations, and personal protective equipment must be worn. Because the high temperatures during welding can often generate intense ultraviolet light, dark goggles or full face shields must be used to protect the eyes. Precautions must also be taken to avoid fires caused by stray sparks and hot welding debris.

=== Compression fittings ===
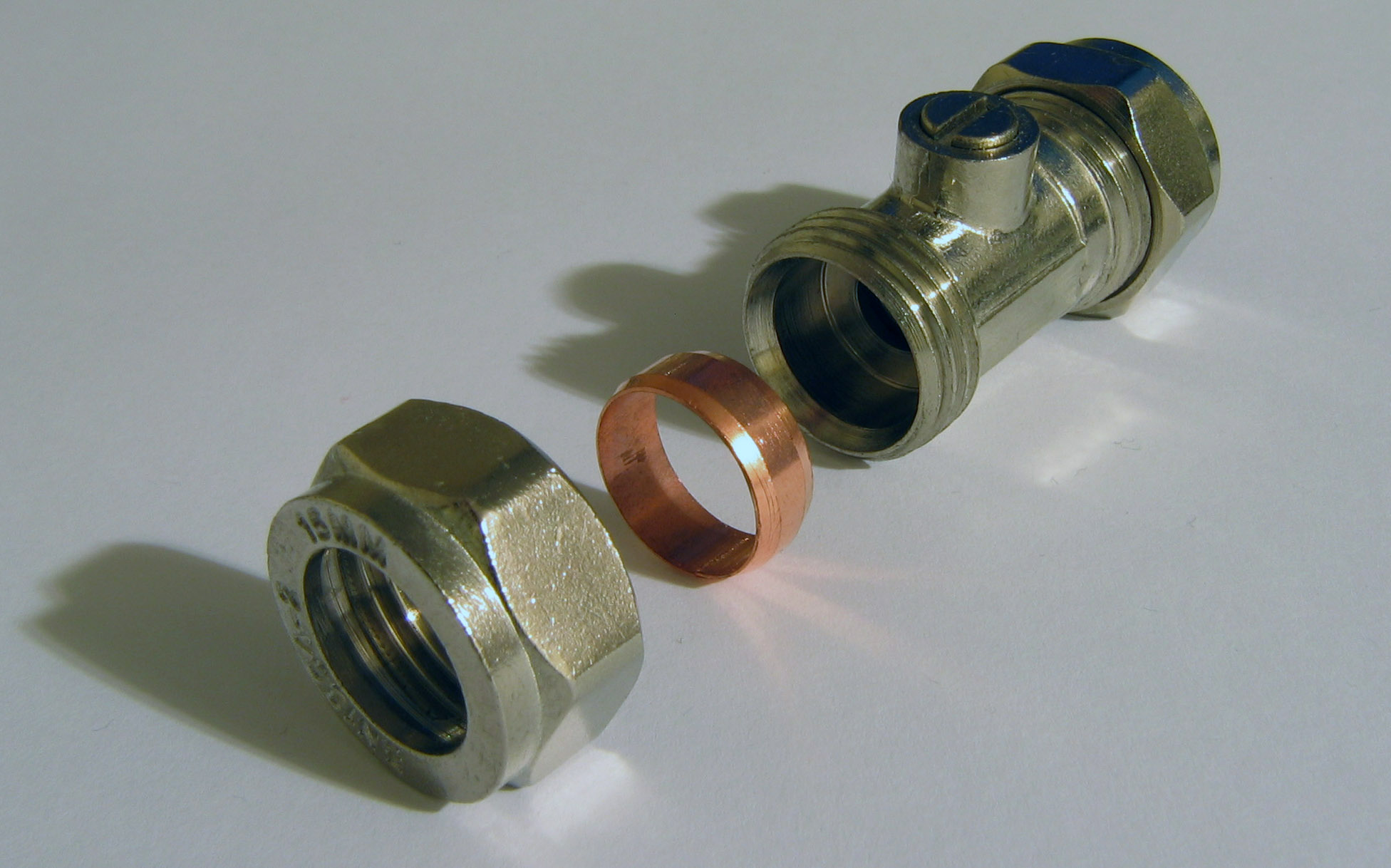
Compression connectors on an isolating valve; the reddish part is a copper compression ring

Compression fittings (sometimes called "lock-bush fittings") consist of a tapered, concave conical seat; a hollow, barrel-shaped compression ring (sometimes called a ferrule); and a compression nut which is threaded onto the body of the fitting and tightened to make a leakproof connection. They are typically brass or plastic, but stainless steel or other materials may be used.

Although compression connections are less durable than soldered (aka sweated) connections, they are easy to install with simple tools. However, they take longer to install than soldered joints and sometimes require re-tightening to stop slow leaks which may develop over time. Because of this possible leakage, they are generally restricted to accessible locations (such as under a kitchen or bathroom sink) and are prohibited in concealed locations such as the interiors of walls.

=== Push-to-pull compression fittings ===
Push-to-pull fittings are easily removed compression fitting that allows pipes to be connected with minimal tools. These fittings are similar to regular compression fittings but use an O-ring for sealing and a grip ring to hold the pipe. The main advantage is that it can easily be removed and re-used, it is easy to assemble, and the joints are still rotatable even after assembly. The pipe end should be square, so it sits against the stop in the fittings and does not create turbulence, and needs to be a clean cut to avoid damaging the O-ring during insertion.

=== Flare fittings ===
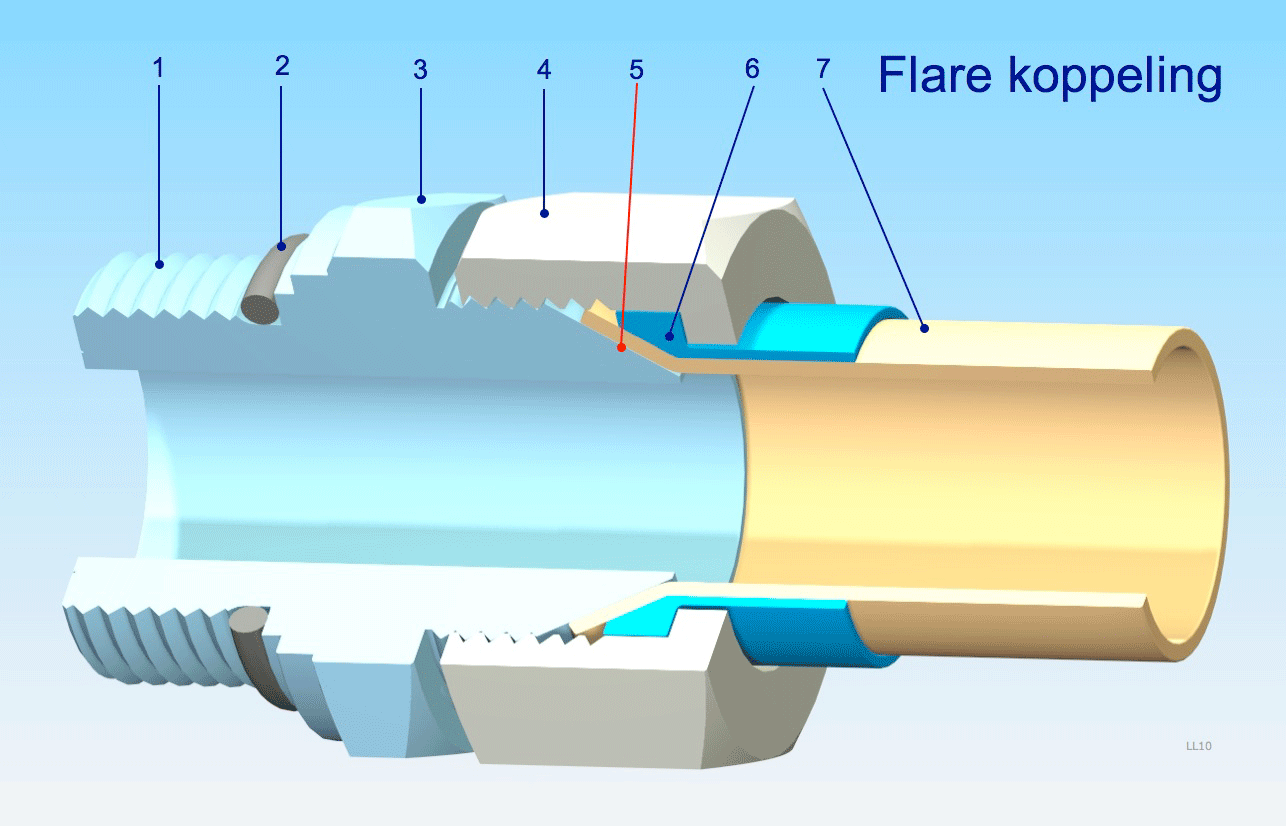
Flare connection: 1) Screw thread; 2) O-ring; 3) Body; 4) Nut; 5) Seal interface; 6) Support ring (sleeve), and 7) Flared tubing

Flared connectors should not be confused with compression connectors, which are generally not interchangeable. Lacking a compression ring, they use a tapered conical shaped connection instead. A specialized flaring tool is used to enlarge tubing into a 45º tapered bell shape matching the projecting shape of the flare fitting. The flare nut, which had previously been installed over the tubing, is then tightened over the fitting to force the tapered surfaces tightly together. Flare connectors are typically brass or plastic, but stainless steel or other materials may be used.

Although flare connections are labor-intensive, they are durable and reliable. Considered more secure against leaks and sudden failure, they are used in hydraulic brake systems and in other high-pressure, high-reliability applications.

=== Flange fittings ===
Flange connection with a gasket

Flange fittings are generally used to connect valves, inline instruments or equipment nozzles. Two surfaces are joined tightly together with threaded bolts, wedges, clamps, or other means of applying high compressive force. Although a gasket, packing, or O-ring may be installed between the flanges to prevent leakage, it is sometimes possible to use only a special grease or nothing at all (if the mating surfaces are sufficiently precisely formed). Although flange fittings are bulky, they perform well in demanding applications such as large water supply networks and hydroelectric systems.

Flanges are rated at 150, 300, 400, 600, 900, 1500, and 2500 psi; or 10, 15, 25, 40, 64, 100, and 150 bars of pressure. Various types of flanges are available, depending on construction. Flanges used in piping (orifice, threaded, slip-on, blind, weld neck, socket weld, lap-joint, and reducing) are available with a variety of facings, such as raised, flat, and ring-joint.

Flange connections tend to be expensive because they require the precision forming of metal. Factory-installed flanges must meet carefully measured dimensional specifications, and pipe segments cut to length on-site require skilled precision welding to attach flanges under more-difficult field conditions.

=== Mechanical fittings ===
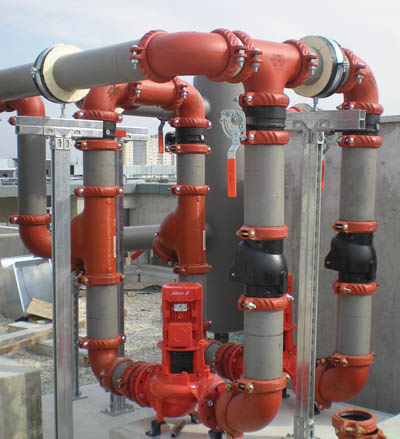
Mechanical sleeve clamps

Manufacturers such as Victaulic and Grinnell produce sleeve-clamp fittings, which replace many flange connections. They attach to the end of a pipe segment via circumferential grooves pressed (or cut) around the end of the pipe to be joined. They are widely used on larger steel pipes and can also be used with other materials.

The chief advantage of these connectors is that they can be installed after cutting the pipe to length in the field. This can save time and considerable expense compared to flange connections, which must be factory- or field-welded to pipe segments. However, mechanically fastened joints are sensitive to residual and thickness stresses caused by dissimilar metals and temperature changes.

A grooved fitting, also known as a grooved coupling, has four elements: grooved pipe, gasket, coupling housing, and nuts and bolts. The groove is made by cold-forming (or machining) a groove at the end of a pipe. A gasket encompassed by coupling housing is wrapped around the two pipe ends, with the coupling engaging the groove; the bolts and nuts are tightened with a socket or impact wrench. The installed coupling housing encases the gasket and engages the grooves around the pipe to create a leakproof seal in a self-restrained pipe joint. There are two types of grooved coupling; a flexible coupling allows a limited amount of angular movement, and a rigid coupling does not allow movement and may be used where joint immobility is required (similar to a flange or welded joint).

=== Pressed or crimped fittings ===
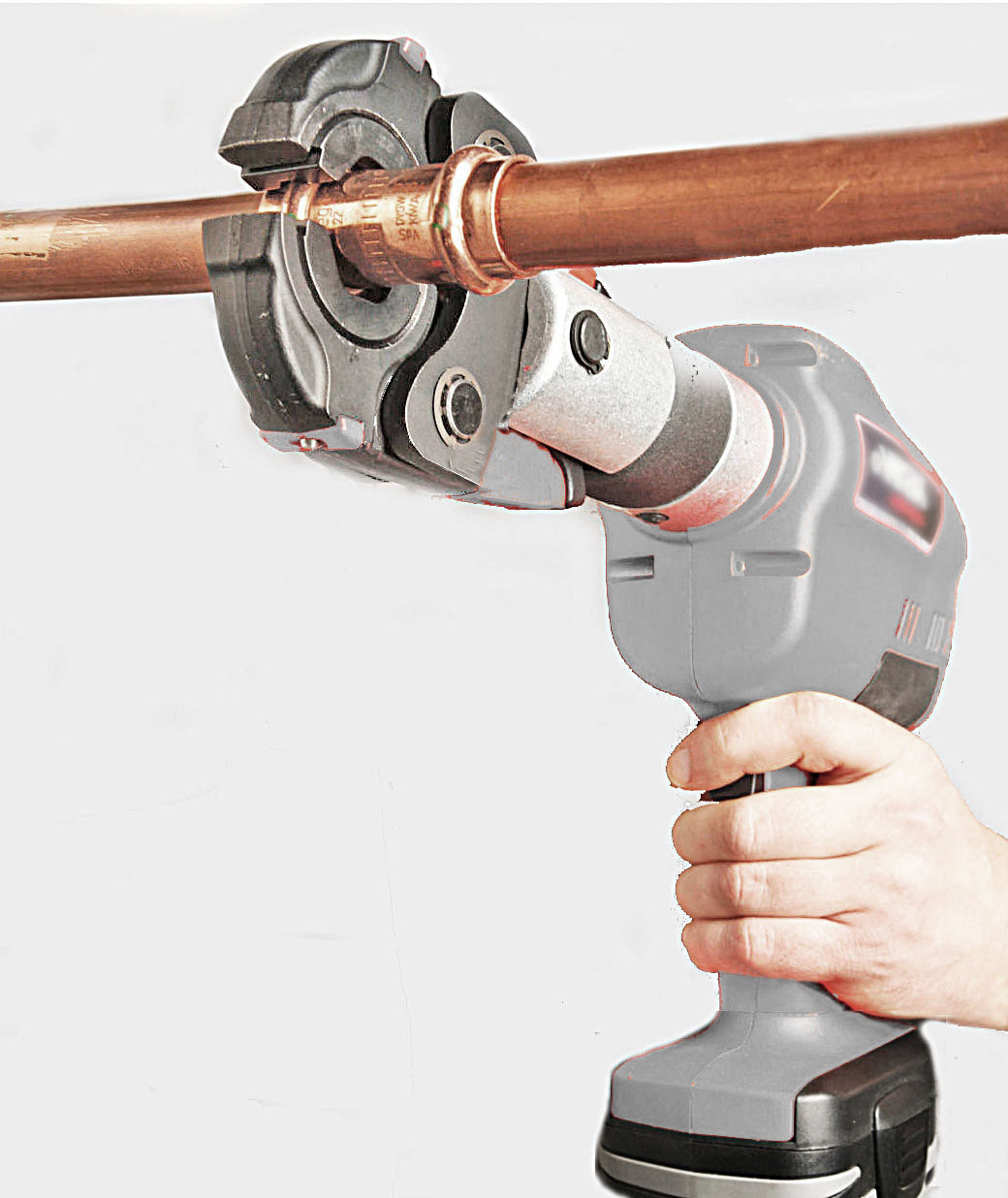
Fitting being crimped using a specialized tool

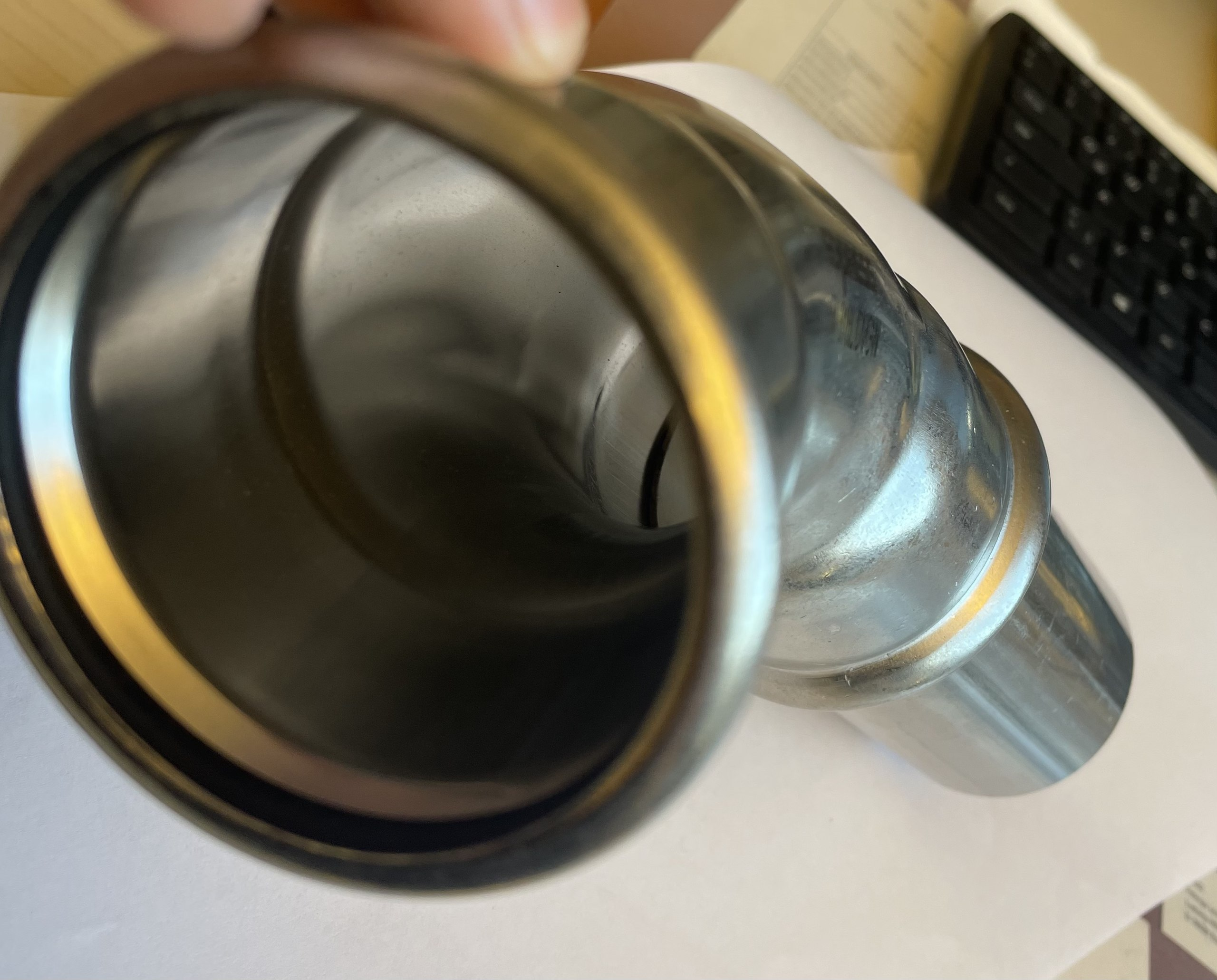
Pressfittings connection with dead space around the O-ring

Crimped or pressed connections to use special fittings permanently attached to tubing with a powered crimper. The fittings, manufactured with a pre-installed sealant or O-ring, slide over the tubing to be connected. High pressure is used to deform the fitting and compress the sealant against the inner tubing, creating a leakproof seal.

The advantages of this method are durability, speed, neatness, and safety. The connection can be made even when the tubing is wet. Crimped fittings are suitable for drinking water pipes and other hot-and-cold systems (including central heating). They are more expensive than sweated fittings.

Press fittings with either V and M profile (or contour) in stainless steel, carbon steel, and copper are trendy in Europe, and several manufacturers such as Viega, Geberit, Swiss Fittings, and ISOTUBI, distribute proprietary systems of press fittings. Compared to other connection types, press fittings have the advantages of installation speed and safety. Pressing a stainless steel fitting can be completed within five seconds with the correct equipment. Primary pressing of fittings to pipes or other fittings is performed using electrically powered press equipment, but mechanically driven press equipment is also available. Swiss Fittings is legally protected the German Brand "Pressfittings aus Edelstahl" in the USA.

Press fittings of some major brands carry a plastic slip around the sleeves on each end of the fitting which falls off when the fitting has been compressed. This allows for a simple identification whether a press fitting has securely been installed.

Press fittings with appropriate and region-specific certification may be used for gas lines. Stainless steel and carbon steel press fittings can withstand up to 16 bars of pressure.

A disadvantage of press fittings is the dead space between the pipe and the fitting, which can possibly rule out use for beverage and food applications.

Types of Pressfittings
Connection Type	All Pressends	Pressend / Male Thread	Pressend / Female Thread	Valve Connection	Flange	End-Connector
	Elbow 90°, F/F & F/M Elbow 45°, F/F & F/M Bend 15°, 45°, 75° M/M Coupling Coupling Long Tee	Elbow 90° Male Coupling Bend 90° Male Thread Tee Male Union Male Coupling Male Straight Connector	Elbow 90° Female Coupling Double Tap Connector 90/90 with Female Thread Elbow 90° Female Adapter Coupling Female Straight Connector Adapter Female Coupling (ISO 228) Female Coupling Tee Female Union Female	3-PC HFF Ball Valve	Flange Coupling	Cap

=== Leaded hub fittings ===
Diagram showing the construction of a typical leaded hub joint

Cast iron piping was traditionally made with one "spigot" end (plain, which was cut to length as needed) and one "socket" or "hub" end (cup-shaped). The larger-diameter hub was also called a "bell" because of its shape.

In use, the spigot of one segment was placed into the socket of the preceding one, and a ring of oakum was forced down into the joint with a caulking iron. Then the remainder of the space in the hub was filled up. Ideally, this would be done by pouring molten lead, allowing it to set, and hammering it tightly with a caulking tool. If this was not possible due to position or some other constraint, the joint could be filled with lead wool or rope, which was forcibly compacted one layer at a time.

This labor-intensive technique was durable if appropriately done but required time, skill, and patience for each joint to be made up. Quicker and lower-cost methods, such as rubber sleeve joints, have replaced mainly leaded hub connections of cast-iron piping in most new installations, but the older technology may still be used for some repairs. In addition, some conservative plumbing codes still require leaded hub joints for final connections where the sewer main leaves a building.

=== Rubber sleeve fittings ===
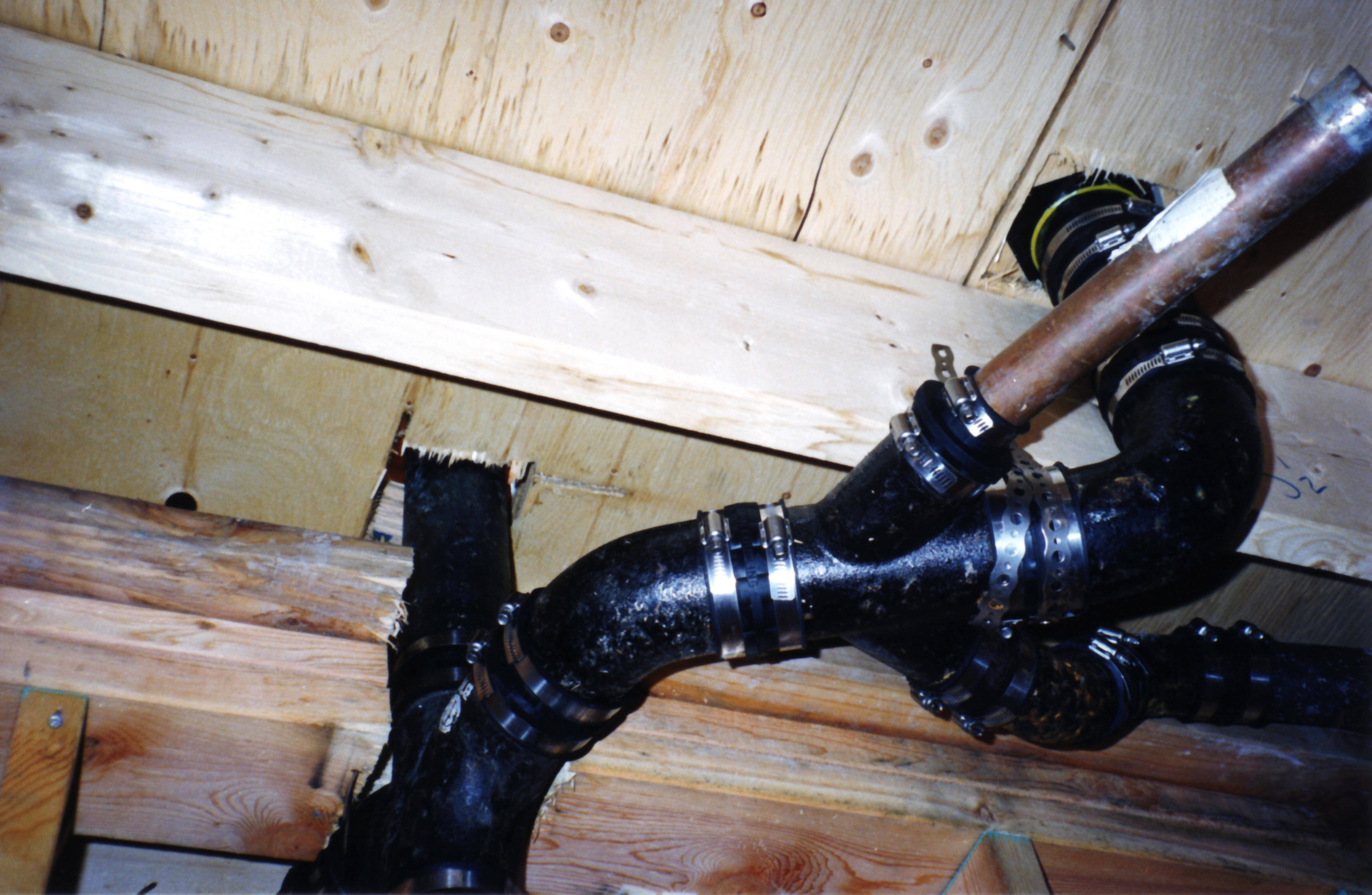
Flexible rubber sleeves are used to connect this cast-iron and copper DWV installation

Cast iron DWV pipe and fittings are still used in premium construction because they muffle the sound of wastewater rushing through them, but today they are rarely joined with traditional lead joints. Instead, pipe and fittings with plain (non-belled) connections are butted against each other, and clamped with special rubber sleeve (or "no-hub") fittings. The rubber sleeves are typically secured with stainless steel worm drive clamping bands, which compress the rubber to make a tight seal around the pipes and fittings. These pipe clamps are similar to hose clamps, but are heavier-duty and ideally are made completely of stainless steel (including the screw) to provide maximum service life. Optionally, the entire rubber sleeve may be jacketed with thin sheet metal, to provide extra stiffness, durability, and resistance to accidental penetration by a misplaced nail or screw. Although the fittings are not cheap, they are reasonably durable (the rubber is typically neoprene or flexible PVC).

An alternative design also allows the selective use of belled fittings made entirely of flexible rubber, including more-complex shapes such as wyes or tee-wyes. They are secured to cast iron pipe segments by use of stainless steel worm drive clamps. Because these fittings are not as stiff as traditional cast-iron fittings, the heavy pipe segments may need better anchoring and support to prevent unwanted movement. The lighter rubber fittings may not muffle sound as well as the heavy cast-iron fittings.

An advantage of flexible rubber fittings is that they can accommodate small misalignments and can be flexed slightly for installation in tight locations. A flexible fitting may be preferred to connect a shower or heavy tub to the drainage system without transmitting slight movements or stresses, which could eventually cause cracking. Flexible fittings may also be used to reduce the transmission of vibration into the DWV system.

If necessary, clamped joints can be disassembled later, and the fittings and pipe may be reconfigured. However, it is often not customary to re-use the clamps and rubber sleeves, which their previous installation may deform and may not seal well after rearranging. Clamped fittings may occasionally need to be disassembled to provide access for "snaking" or "rodding-out" with a unique tool to clear blockage or clogs. This is also an indication that a clean-out fitting could be installed to provide easier future access.

== See also ==
- Cutting ring fitting
- Drain (plumbing)
- Driving cap
- Flange
- Gladhand connector
- Pipe
- Pipefitter
- Pipe support
- Plumber
- Rainwater, surface, and subsurface water drainage
- Septic systems
- Traps, Drains, and Vents
- Victaulic
- Water cooling
- Water supply systems
