= United States building energy codes =

Subset of building codes

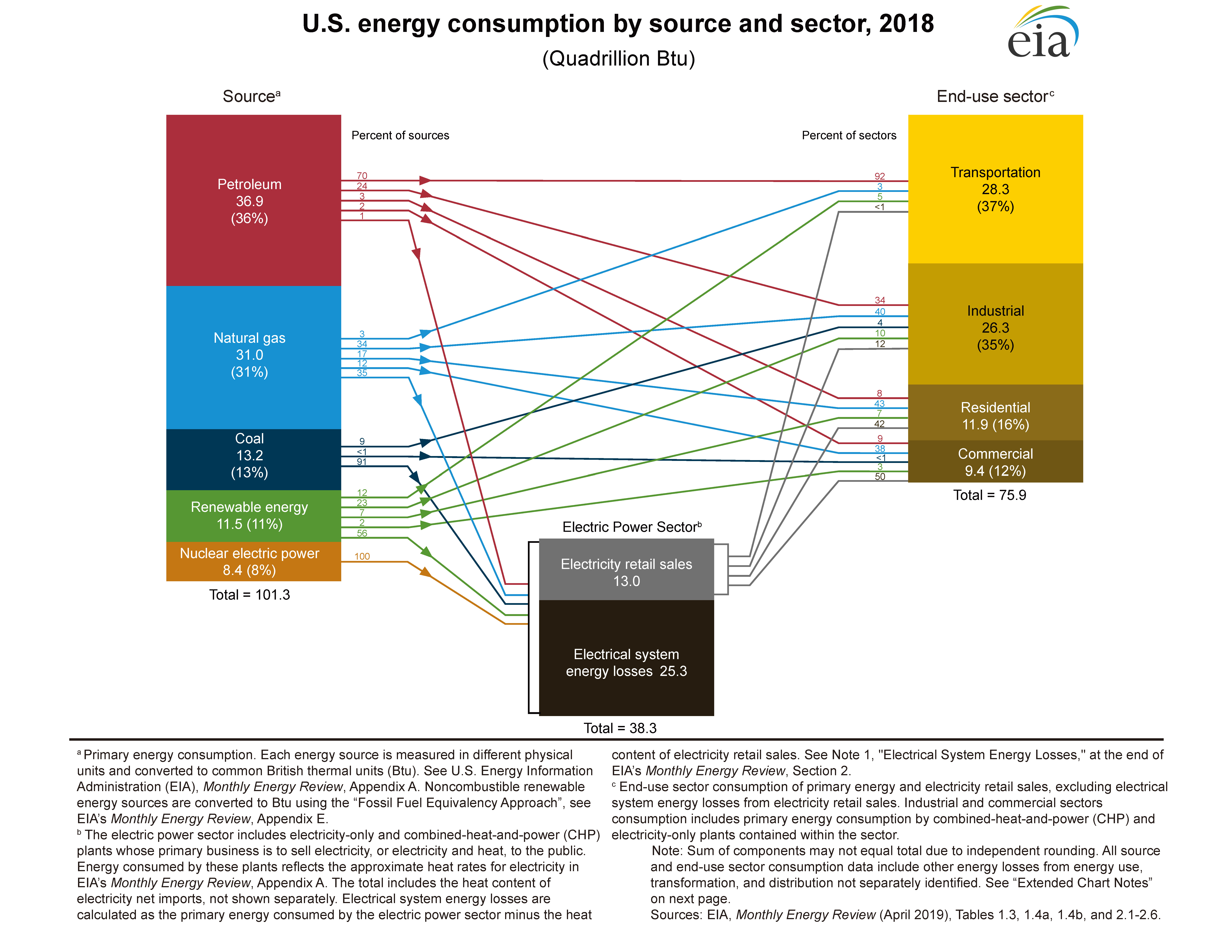
U.S. primary energy consumption by source and sector, 2018. Note: Energy Consumption for combined commercial and residential sectors is 39% of Total Energy Consumption when electrical system energy losses are included.

United States building energy codes are a subset of building codes that set minimum requirements for energy-efficient design and construction for new and renovated buildings. The intent of these energy codes is to moderate and reduce energy use and emissions throughout the lifetime of a building. Energy code provisions may include various aspects of building design and construction, such as: HVAC systems, building envelope, electrical, and lighting systems. There are building energy codes for both commercial and residential buildings. However, just as the United States does not have a national building code, it also does not have a national building energy code; rather, state, and local governments choose to adopt—and potentially revise—national model energy codes and standards. Consequently, building energy codes, and building codes in general, vary between states and jurisdictions.

Commercial and residential buildings, combined, account for 39% of total U.S. energy consumption and about 75% of total U.S. electricity use. As such, by setting the minimum energy-efficiency requirements for building design and construction, energy codes have the capacity to increase cost-savings, advance energy independence, reduce greenhouse gas emissions, and drive economic opportunity through technological innovations.

== Overview of Building Codes in the United States ==
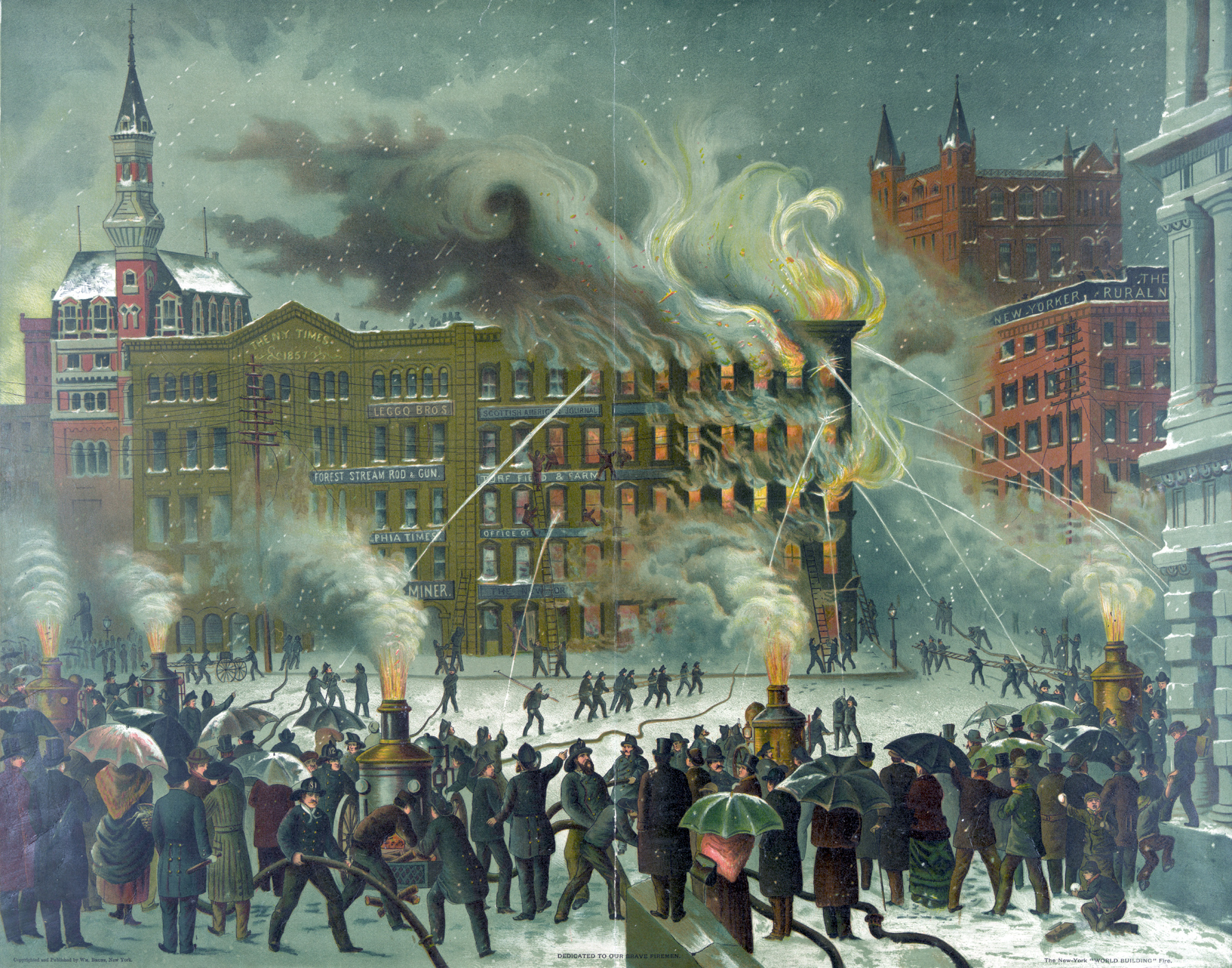
Depiction of New York World Building fire in New York City in 1882.

Building codes in the United States are a collection of regulations and laws adopted by state and local jurisdictions that set "minimum requirements for how structural systems, plumbing, heating, ventilation, and air conditioning (HVAC), natural gas systems and other aspects of residential and commercial buildings should be designed and constructed." The building code in many jurisdictions will often refer to an overarching "building code," which contains a collection of subset regulations (also called codes), such as the: Electrical Code (referring to the electrical system), Building Code (referring to structure and design), Plumbing Code, Fire Code, Mechanical Code, and Energy Code. In general, these codes are interrelated and inform aspects of one another, for example, provisions in the Fire Code regarding commercial cooking appliances and exhaust hoods may refer to installation provisions of appliances in the Mechanical Code. Built on a long history of fire and natural disaster protection, the foundational purpose of building codes is to protect "the health, safety, and welfare of the public" as it pertains to the design and construction of buildings.

=== Codes vs. Standards vs. Model Codes ===
There is a distinction to be made between codes, standards, and model codes. Codes are mandatory, legally enforceable requirements adopted by state and local jurisdictions. Standards, founded on evidence-based technical information, are non-mandatory recommendations and guidelines for best practices regarding various aspects of building design and construction. Though jurisdictions can adopt standards directly in a building code, "standard committees generally write standards with the intent that they become a component of a model code." A model building code is a building code that incorporates standards and is "developed and maintained by an organization independent of the jurisdiction responsible for enacting the building code."

A model code does not carry the force of law, but is created to be adopted by a jurisdiction and is "written in a mandatory, enforceable language, [so] state and local jurisdictions can easily adopt the model." If the model code is adopted—and likely revised to fit the context of a specific jurisdiction—then the model becomes a part of, or serves as the "model" for, the legally enforceable building code in state and local jurisdictions.

=== Model Building Codes in the United States ===
The most widely used model building codes in the United States are published by the International Code Council, or the ICC, colloquially known as the I-Codes. Fifty states and the District of Columbia have adopted the I-Codes at the state or jurisdictional level. The International Code Council (ICC) develops the codes and standards used to construct residential and commercial buildings, including homes and schools.

For commercial buildings, the central model code adopted as a base code in many jurisdictions is the International Building Code, developed by the ICC, and for residential buildings, the predominant model code used is the International Residential Code (IRC), also developed by the ICC. Other model building codes, created by the ICC, and often adopted as a part of jurisdictional building codes, include the International Fire Code, International Energy Conservation Code, and International Mechanical code. The I-Codes are updated every three years.

Model building codes are applied differently between states and jurisdictions. This is by design, when model codes are adopted, the code provisions are dependent on regional climate and hazard risks, for example, "while California's codes focus more on earthquakes, Florida's include more measures addressing hurricanes." Upon adoption, model codes are often amended and managed in accordance with jurisdictional needs, preferences, and currently existing legislation. This means that, with every three year update of the I-Codes, some model code provisions will not be included in certain jurisdictional building codes. As the National Institute of Standards and Technology put it, "some states may limit or strike out new requirements they view as too costly, unnecessary or otherwise inappropriate for their constituents. Others may see value in the updates, sealing them into law or even strengthening them to protect their community." For example, in 2009 the International Residential Code (IRC) was updated to include a provision requiring sprinklers in all new one-and two-family residences, and townhouses. While California and Pennsylvania adopted the new change, other states like New Hampshire delayed adoption of the code until 2012, and further, some states like Alaska, Texas, and Georgia opposed the addition of the provision to their building codes altogether.

== Building Energy Codes: Development & Adoption ==
=== Model Energy Codes & Standards ===
According to the U.S. Department of Energy, "energy codes and standards set minimum efficiency requirements for new and renovated buildings, assuring reductions in energy use and emissions over the life of the building." As with other building codes, model energy codes and standards are often written in a language such that they can be adopted—wholly, partially, or amended—into a jurisdiction's legal building code.

The primary baseline national model energy codes are the International Energy Conservation Code (IECC), the ANSI/ASHRAE/IESNA Standard 90.1: Energy-Efficient Standard for Buildings Except Low-Rise Residential Buildings (ASHRAE 90.1), and ASHRAE Standard 90.2: Energy-Efficient Standard of New Low-Rise Residential Buildings. Two private organizations develop these model energy codes, the International Code Council (ICC) and the American Society of Heating, Refrigerating, and Air-Conditioning Engineers (ASHRAE).

The IECC has provisions that apply to both residential and commercial buildings, and, as stated in the above description, ASHRAE 90.1 refers to all buildings except low-rise residential, and ASHRAE 90.2 refers to residential buildings three stories or less.

In the development of model energy codes and standards, commercial and residential buildings are considered separate in order to allow for different provisions and parameters.

=== Commercial ===
Commercial buildings are defined as "all buildings other than low-rise residential buildings, including multi-family high-rise residential buildings over three stories." The model code, IECC, and the standard, ASHRAE 90.1, apply to commercial buildings. The IECC references several ASHRAE Standards, in particular, ASHRAE 90.1 for commercial building construction.

Being a part of the ICC's collection of model codes, the IECC is revised annually and published in full-form every three years. Headed by an ICC committee, revisions and code changes can be proposed by any interested individual, business, or organization. The development and revision process include two public hearings to consider revisions and testimony. The process concludes with a consensus vote, by IECC members, on all the changes.

ASHRAE 90.1 follows a similar path of development and revision. Though ASHRAE 90.1 is revised and published every three years just like the IECC, people can submit interim revisions at any time within this period. ASHRAE has a standards committee that manages the process, and votes on the final versions of the energy code.

Provisions in the commercial sector of the model codes affect building design and construction factors such as: thermal envelope, water heating, HVAC, and lighting systems. In the 2021 IECC model code, for example, there are provisions that reference ASHRAE 90.1 concerning insulation R-values for opaque parts of the building envelope. As another example, there are provisions in the IECC concerning the length, flow-rate, and insulation of piping as it relates to hot-water heaters in commercial buildings.

=== Residential ===
Residential buildings are defined as "one- and two-family attached or detached dwellings, and multi-family buildings three or fewer stories above grade." The model code, IECC, and standard, ASHRAE 90.2, apply to residential buildings.

Both the residential component of the IECC and ASHRAE 90.2 follow the same development and revision processes as described above in the commercial section, however, in the case of ASHRAE 90.2, the standards committee is maintained by a separate committee than the one that heads ASHRAE 90.1.

Provisions in these model codes concern many of the same aspects as those in the commercial sector, just at a different scope. In the 2021 IECC model code concerning residential energy efficiency, for example, there are provisions concerning different fenestration (window) U-Factors that are dependent on climate zone. Additionally, similar to the commercial sector, the residential provisions address hot-water circulation systems, exterior lighting systems, and insulation.

=== Prescriptive vs. Performance ===
Energy code provisions are usually designed with two different compliance path formats (i.e., the path needed to meet the requirements or intended result of the code): Prescriptive and Performance-based.

A prescriptive energy code delineates specific requirements or criteria for building components that must be fulfilled in order to be in compliance with the code. For example, "the allowable watts per square foot of lighting systems, and the minimum energy efficiencies required of mechanical systems."

Performance-based codes are results-oriented, where compliance is predicated more on performing to a certain baseline of energy use. The performance path allows for some more flexibility, when compared to prescriptive codes. The performance path achieves this by creating space for building design-solutions that provide trade-offs between energy-intensive systems in order to meet both the energy performance goal and optimize cost-effective measures for a specific building.

=== Code Adoption ===
Model energy codes and standards can be adopted into legal building codes by jurisdictions around the United States. However, state and local jurisdictions will often carryout amendments, addenda, and provisions of their own to suit specific needs and preferences.

The adoption of energy codes typically follow two main avenues: legislation or regulatory action. In each case, the adoption process usually includes an advisory body, review and revision process, and public hearings. With the legislation route, rather than creating an entire energy model code wholesale, the state legislation will often reference an already existing model energy code and standard like the IECC. In this case, state legislation is adopting the model code directly. The regulation route uses legislation not to adopt the code directly, but instead to delegate a regulatory agency or authority to adopt, implement, and enforce the energy code.

As reported by Pacific Northwest National Laboratory, there is one other, more rare path to code adoption via local government: "if a state has limited authority to adopt an energy code (a 'home rule' state), units of local government have the option to assume that responsibility." For example, in 2001, Chicago became the first jurisdiction in Illinois to adopt a building energy code, a modified version of IECC 2000.

The U.S. Department of Energy has a presence throughout the development and adoption of building energy codes and standards; the DOE participates in provisions, hearings, and suggests changes to model codes. Likewise, federal regulations impact the processes involved in the development and adoption of national model energy codes. For example, the Energy Conservation and Production Act (ECPA) requires the DOE "to provide technical assistance to states to support implementation of state residential and commercial building energy efficiency codes." Indeed, the DOE's Office of Energy Efficiency & Renewable Energy runs the Building Energy Codes Program (BECP) for this exact reason, in order "to support building energy code development, adoption, implementation, and enforcement processes."

=== Compliance & Enforcement ===
Building energy code compliance is usually done at the local or municipal level by professionals trained to conduct field inspections and review construction plans. Compliance is where the standards and agreed-upon codes become a reality, without proper compliance and enforcement the goals of the code will likely not come to fruition. However, "compliance and enforcement of building energy codes is a key challenge, even in jurisdictions with advanced building code processes. Local governments are often the most critical actors in supporting effective compliance and building code enforcement."

Compliance requires cooperation at multiple levels and in multiple ways: state and local government issuing proper permits and establishing dedicated departments, the thorough education of building officials on new code developments, and the responsibility of building design and construction professionals to comply with the energy code. As the energy code continues develop in the United States, this sentiment may become increasingly outdated, but in discussing compliance:

building officials and builders in some parts of the country see the energy code as fundamentally different from the historical 'health, life, and safety' codes that were created primarily to protect occupants from fire, flooding, and collapse. Energy codes are a more recent addition to the building codes family, with the first having been adopted in the late 1970s, while structural and fire codes have existed for hundreds of years/When resources are limited at local building departments, which is often the case, the energy code is likely to get less attention.

=== Energy Code Impacts ===
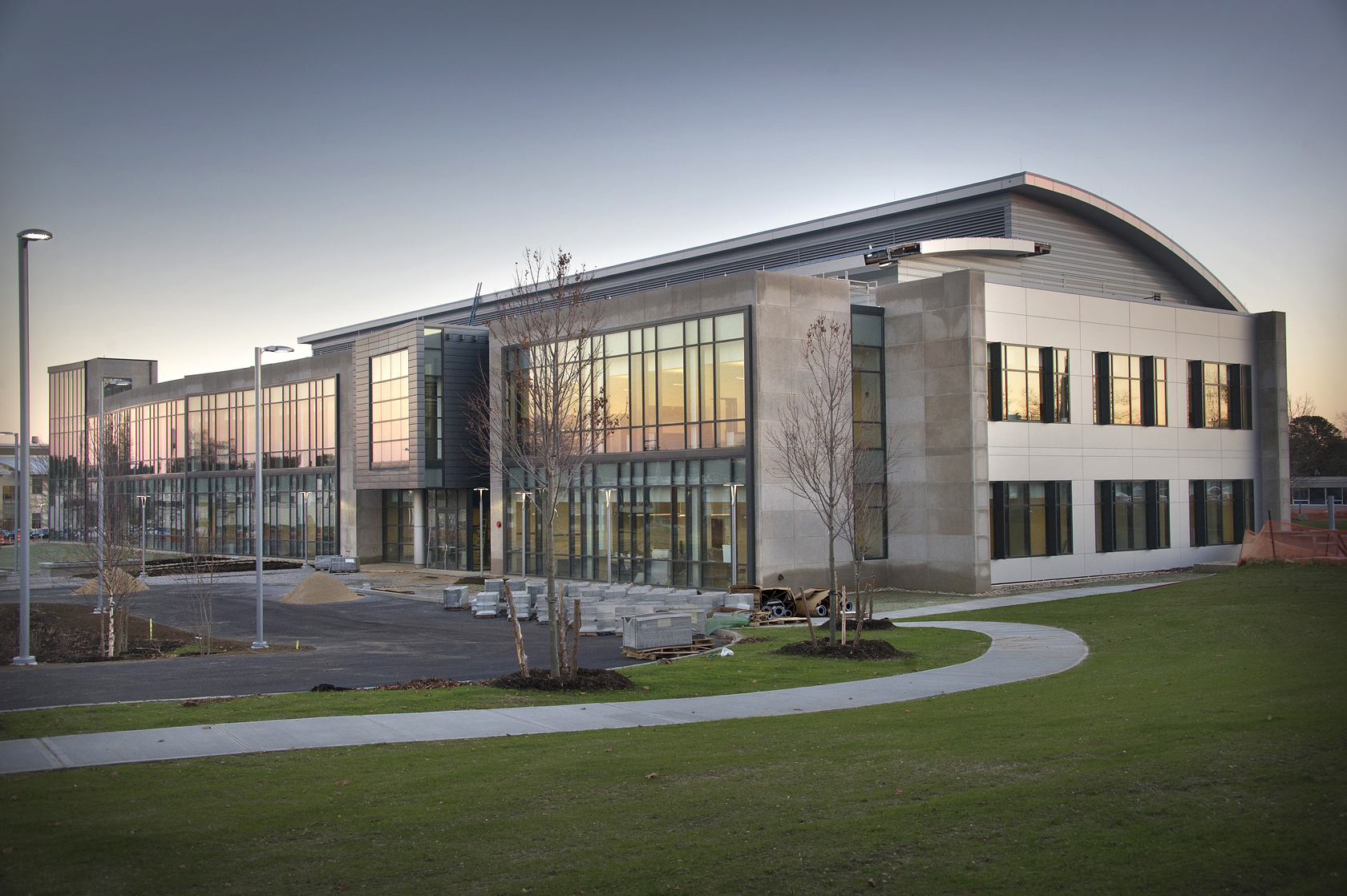
Interdisciplinary Science Building at Brookhaven National Laboratory: energy efficient and environmentally sustainable laboratory building focused on energy-related research

==== Benefits and Future Considerations ====
Since buildings make-up such a large percentage of U.S. energy consumption, energy efficient building codes can have a large positive impact on cost-savings, energy independence, and ecological systems.

Additionally, the adoption of codes that increase energy performance can improve building habitability and comfort which has been linked to an increase in productivity. Building-focused energy conservation has the potential to greatly reduce global carbon emissions. A reduction in carbon emissions can reduce air pollutants, mitigate harmful effects of climate change, and drive positive impacts on overall wellbeing and health.

==== Barriers and Drawbacks ====
In certain circumstances, adopting the energy efficient technologies required to meet building energy codes may increase overall costs for a builder. The vast amount of buildings codes and standards that regulate building design and construction can be confusing for builders, lawmakers, and code developers alike. This is made more apparent when trying to chart a path toward a specific goal such as energy efficiency and emissions reduction. In turn, it can present a barrier to energy code adoption.

== See Also ==
- Energy conservation ("Buildings")
- Green building
- International Energy Conservation Code
- Building code
- International Building Code
- Energy
- Energy-efficient HVAC
