= Defenestration (disambiguation) =

Defenestration is the act of throwing someone or something out of a window.

Defenestration may also refer to:

- Defenestration (band), an English nu metal band, active from 1999 to 2004
- May the Lord Be with Us, a 2018 Czech historical television film originally titled Defenestration

== See also ==
- Fenestration (disambiguation)
