= ASHRAE 90.1 =

Engineering standard

ANSI/ASHRAE/IES Standard 90.1: Energy Standard for Buildings Except Low-Rise Residential Buildings is an American National Standards Institute (ANSI) standard published by ASHRAE and jointly sponsored by the Illuminating Engineering Society (IES) that provides minimum requirements for energy efficient designs for buildings except for low-rise residential buildings (i.e. single-family homes, multi-family buildings less than four stories high, mobile homes and modular homes). The original standard, ASHRAE 90, was published in 1975. There have been multiple editions to it since. In 1999 the ASHRAE Board of Directors voted to place the standard on continuous maintenance, based on rapid changes in energy technology and energy prices. This allows it to be updated multiple times in a year. The standard was renamed ASHRAE 90.1 in 2001. It has since been updated in 2004, 2007, 2010, 2013, 2016, and 2019 to reflect newer and more efficient technologies.

== Structure and form ==
In general, there are two means, or paths for building designers to comply with ASHRAE 90.1:

- Prescriptive path: All components of the building meet the minimum standards specified by ASHRAE 90.1.
- Performance path: A proposed building design is demonstrated (through building performance simulation) to use less energy than a baseline building built to ASHRAE 90.1 specifications. This now has three paths. For code compliance there is Chapter 11, which compares an energy model for your building to an energy model for a barely compliant building with the same HVAC system and in the 2016 edition an Appendix G path was added that compares an energy model of your building against a baseline model based on the 2004 edition of Standard 90.1 and requires lower energy consumption that varies depending on the building type.

Within the sections of the standard, there are some variations to this. Some sections have mandatory provisions, simplified approaches, or trade-off opportunities.

=== Prescriptive path ===
ASHRAE 90.1 includes prescriptive requirements for the following:

- Building envelope (Section 5): minimum wall insulation, minimum roof insulation, roof reflectance, minimum glazing performance
- HVAC (Section 6): minimum equipment efficiency, minimum system features, limitation on reheat, limitation on fan power
- Domestic hot water (Section 7): minimum equipment efficiency, minimum system features
- Power (Section 8): transformer efficiency, automatic receptacle controls, energy monitoring
- Lighting (Section 9): maximum indoor lighting power density (LPD, expressed in Watts/Sq.Ft.), minimum lighting controls, exterior lighting, parking garage lighting
- Other equipment (Section 10): electric motors, potable water booster pumps, elevators, and escalators

=== Performance path ===
In the performance approach, a baseline energy cost budget (ECB) is established, based on the building size and program. This baseline ECB is established using building performance simulation to model a building with the same size and program as the project building, built according to the prescriptive requirements of ASHRAE 90.1 (sections 5-10). The ECB is expressed in units of dollars.

A building performance simulation is then performed on the proposed building design. The proposed energy cost budget must be less than or equal to the baseline energy cost budget to achieve compliance.

The performance approach is also used to demonstrate design energy efficiency, often expressed as percent better than ASHRAE Standard 90.1. Building designs will state their performance as "40% better than ASHRAE 90.1-2007" or "20% better than ASHRAE 90.1-2010". Percent improvement over ASHRAE 90.1 is the basis for awarding energy points within the LEED rating system.

== Status as an energy code and industry standard ==
Many states apply ASHRAE 90.1 to buildings being constructed or under renovation. Most states apply the standard or equivalent standards for all commercial buildings. Others apply the standard or equivalent standards for all government buildings. There are some states that use other energy conservation standards for all commercial buildings and some other states that use a combination of the ASHRAE 90.1 standard for all government buildings and use other energy conservation standards for their commercial buildings. A few states do not apply any energy conservation standards for their government and commercial buildings.

Current status of adoption into energy codes is tracked by the Building Codes Assistance Project. As of September 2020, 7 states have codes which meet or exceed ASHRAE Standard 90.1-2016; 14 states have codes which meet or exceed ASHRAE Standard 90.1-2013; 8 states have codes which meet or exceed ASHRAE Standard 90.1-2010; 9 states have codes which meet or exceed ASHRAE Standard 90.1-2007 and 8 states have either no statewide code or a code which precedes 90.1-2004. The California Energy Code (CCR Title 24 Part 6) has a very similar structure and requirements.

ASHRAE 90.1 is also an industry standard referenced by the USGBC in the LEED building certification program. It is frequently used as a baseline for comparison during energy retrofit projects or any project that employs building performance simulation.

Outside the US, India's Energy Conservation Building Code, has a similar form and scope to ASHRAE 90.1. (Other countries have different forms such as Ireland's building energy rating, or Hong Kong's Buildings Energy Efficiency Ordinance)

== History and development ==
=== Standard 90-1975 ===
Development of Standard 90 began in the aftermath of the 1970s energy crisis. ASHRAE president Robert R. Kirkwood made the ASHRAE theme of 1973 "Optimum Energy Utilization Through Technology". At ASHRAE's winter meeting in Los Angeles in February 1974, the National Bureau of Standards (NBS) presented their early developments of a building energy standard to 200 ASHRAE meeting participants. NBS and the National Conference of States on Building Codes and Standards (NCSBCS) offered to turn development of the standard over to ASHRAE, and ASHRAE accepted.

The development of the proposed standard, Standard 90P, was completed in less than six months. ASHRAE enlisted representatives from the American Institute of Architects (AIA), Illuminating Engineering Society (IES), Mechanical Contractors Association of America (MCAA), Air Conditioning and Refrigeration Institute (ARI), and the Electrical Energy Association (EEA). A draft of the standard was issued on June 21, 1974, to 5,000 industry stakeholders for public review. Comments were received, revisions were made, and the initial version was issued as ASHRAE Standard 90-1975 on January 14, 1975.

=== 2004 ===
In 2004 the ASHRAE 90.1 standard applied to buildings, the building envelope, and majority of mechanical and lighting systems in the building. New buildings being constructed and the systems that run the new buildings would be covered by the standard. The standard would also apply to additions to existing buildings and their systems as well as alterations to an existing buildings system. For ASHRAE 90.1 standard to apply to the building envelope the building will need to be heated by a heating system that has an output capacity greater than 3.4 Btu/(h⋅ft2) or be cooled by a cooling system that has an output capacity greater than 5 Btu/(h⋅ft2). The buildings that are exempted from ASHRAE 90.1 are single family homes, multifamily of three stories or less homes, manufactured or modular homes, buildings that do not use electricity or fossil fuels, and equipment and building systems that are used for industrial, manufacturing, or commercial purposes.

=== 2007 ===
In 2007 the updated version of the ASHRAE 90.1 covers many sections of a building which include building envelope, HVAC, hot water, and lighting.

The building envelope has to be categorized into three different categories of conditioned space which are (a) nonresidential conditioned space, (b) residential conditioned space, and (c) semiheated space. Each one has different requirements to meet. There are also mandatory provisions that building envelopes have to abide by which are insulation, fenestration and doors, and air leakage. The requirements for these provisions are in the ASHRAE 90.1 manual and have many requirements for each. Each section of the building envelope, Roof, Walls, and Floor have different requirements for each of the mandatory provisions.

The HVAC system has many different requirements that have to be met. This is because there are many types of HVAC systems each with different requirements. The HVAC section has the most requirements because there are so many different types of systems. There are systems that can not be used and things that systems must have to meet the requirements. ASHRAE 90.1 document has multiple tables that give minimum efficiency requirements for each system.

Hot water systems must go through a load calculation before they are installed. Each system must meet the manufacturer's sizing guidelines. Each system must also have equipment that meets the minimum efficiency that is in a table in the ASHRAE 90.1 document. The pipes that hold the hot water need to be insulated and there are certain insulation requirements for each system type and piping material. There are many controls that hot water systems need and each control has a different requirement. These include are temperature controls, temperature maintenance controls, outlet temperature controls, and circulation pump controls. There are also requirements for pool heaters, pool covers, and heat traps for heated pools.

If new lights are installed or replaced in any building space, with a few exceptions, they must abide by the Lighting Power Density requirements. Lighting also has many requirements to follow, which includes the prescriptive requirements to determine the quantity of lights for the building. There are also interior lighting controls that need to be installed for buildings larger than 5000 sq. ft. There are also many requirements on lighting that include exit signs and exterior lights.

=== 2010 ===
In the 2010 edition of ASHRAE 90.1, many changes were made, including definitions, tables, and sections. Energy savings compared to 90.1-2004 were approximately 25 percent including plug loads and approximately 31 percent excluding plug loads. DOE issued a positive determination and notified states that they should adopt 90.1-2010 or a code that DOE accepts as equivalent by October 2013.

The scope was expanded to include defined industrial processes, which in the 2010 edition includes only economizers for data centers. Changes to Building Envelope include skylights, solar reflectance, thermal emittance, air barriers, and solar orientation.

Minimum efficiency requirements for many types of HVAC equipment were revised. Other revisions affect the maximum fan power limits, pump head calculation, chilled water pipe sizing, radiant panel insulation, single-zone VAV, and supply air temperature reset. Energy recovery is required for many more HVAC systems. Several reheat exceptions were eliminated or modified. Restrictions were placed on overhead air heating. Economizer requirements were added for more climate zones and smaller systems. Class A is now required for all duct sealing.

Lighting power densities (LPD) dropped slightly on average. Daylighting and associated lighting control requirements were added. Many lighting control requirements were added, including independent functional testing of lighting controls, occupancy and vacancy controls, exterior lighting controls, and whole-building shutoff. Offices and computer classrooms now require 50 percent of 120 V receptacles to be automatically switched. Requirements were added for service water booster pumps and elevators.

=== 2013 ===
In the 2013 edition several updates were made to the building envelope, lighting and mechanical sections of the standard. With each new edition of ANSI/ASHRAE/IES Standard 90.1, DOE is required by statute to issue a determination as to whether the updated edition will improve energy efficiency in commercial buildings. DOE issued a positive determination stating that Standard 90.1-2013 would achieve greater energy efficiency in buildings subject to that code. Compared to 90.1-2010, 90.1-2013 is expected to save approximately 8.7% in energy cost, 8.5% in source energy and 6.7% in site energy.

Updates to the building envelope section of 90.1-2013 include changes to the prescriptive opaque envelope and fenestration performance requirements in several climate zones and modifications to the fenestration orientation requirements. Updates to the lighting section include modified lighting power allowance requirement for interior and exterior lights; and modifications to lighting control requirements based on daylighting and occupancy sensors. In the mechanical section, minimum efficiency requirements for many types of HVAC equipment are revised. In addition new requirements for commercial refrigerators, freezers and refrigeration equipment, heating systems in vestibules and modifications for optimum start requirement for DDC systems, system size and outdoor air thresholds for energy recovery and occupancy threshold for DCV are included.

=== 2016 ===
The 2016 edition of ASHRAE 90.1 contains several important changes to reduce energy consumption in commercial buildings. Significant changes include a new compliance path known as Performance Rating method included in Appendix G of the standards document, addition of two new weather zones, a new document format and new technical requirements for building envelope, lighting and mechanical systems. DOE issued a positive determination that Standard 90.1-2016 would achieve greater energy efficiency in buildings subject to the code and notified states that they should adopt 90.1-2016 or a code that DOE accepts as equivalent by February 2020. Compared to 90.1-2013, 90.1-2016 is expected to save approximately 8.2% in energy cost, 7.9% in source energy and 6.7% in site energy.

Updates to the building envelope section include mandatory requirements for envelope verification, documentation supporting air infiltration reduction, updates to air leakage requirements of overhead doors; changes to prescriptive requirements for metal building roofs, walls and fenestration and opaque doors and additional requirements for climate zone 0. Updates under lighting section include modified lighting power allowance requirement for interior and exterior lights; light source efficacy requirements for dwelling units and modifications to lighting control requirements. Under the mechanical section modifications include updates to the chilled water plant metering, DOAS, elevator efficiency, economizer fault detection and diagnostics.

In addition to the energy cost budget method Appendix G is allowed as a new compliance path. The Appendix G baseline is fixed at a specific level allowing buildings from any code version to be compared against a stable baseline using a new metric called building performance factor (BPF). The BPF is based on climate zone and building type allowing for greater flexibility in compliance modeling.

=== 2019 ===
In the 2019 edition of ASHRAE 90.1, various modifications and clarifications were made to improve internal consistency. Significant changes include: new commissioning requirements per ASHRAE/IES Standard 202; and updates to building Envelope, Lighting, Mechanical, Energy Cost Budget, Performance Rating Method sections.

Updates to the building envelope section include revision to exceptions for air leakage requirements and SHGC, U-factor revisions for fenestrations. Under the lighting section the lighting power density allowance is modified for the Space-by-Space and Building Area methods. A new simplified lighting method is added for office and retail buildings up to 25,000 square feet (2,300 m^{2}). Additionally, lighting control requirements for parking garages and exceptions for controls in daylit areas are included. Under the mechanical section new requirements are added for allowing option of using ASHRAE 90.4 instead of ASHRAE Standard 90.1 in computer rooms with IT equipment load larger than 10 kW; pump efficiency; updates to equipment efficiency tables, new requirements for reporting fan power for ceiling fans; updated requirements for fan motor selection; and new requirements for energy recovery in high-rise residential buildings and for condenser heat recovery for acute care inpatient hospitals.

Under Section 11, Energy Cost Budget (ECB) Method baseline requirement for on-site electricity generation systems are added. Updates to the Performance Rating Method (Appendix G) section of the standards include clarifications for fan and coil sizing, explicit heating and cooling COP without fan for baseline packaged cooling equipment, new rules for modeling automatic receptacle controls and baseline envelope infiltration and updated building performance factors. In addition under both compliance paths updated language for treatment of renewables and lighting modeling are included.
