= IGCC =

IGCC may refer to:

- Integrated gasification combined cycle, a power generation technology
- International Green Construction Code
- UC Institute on Global Conflict and Cooperation
