= Building occupancy classifications =

Zoning use system

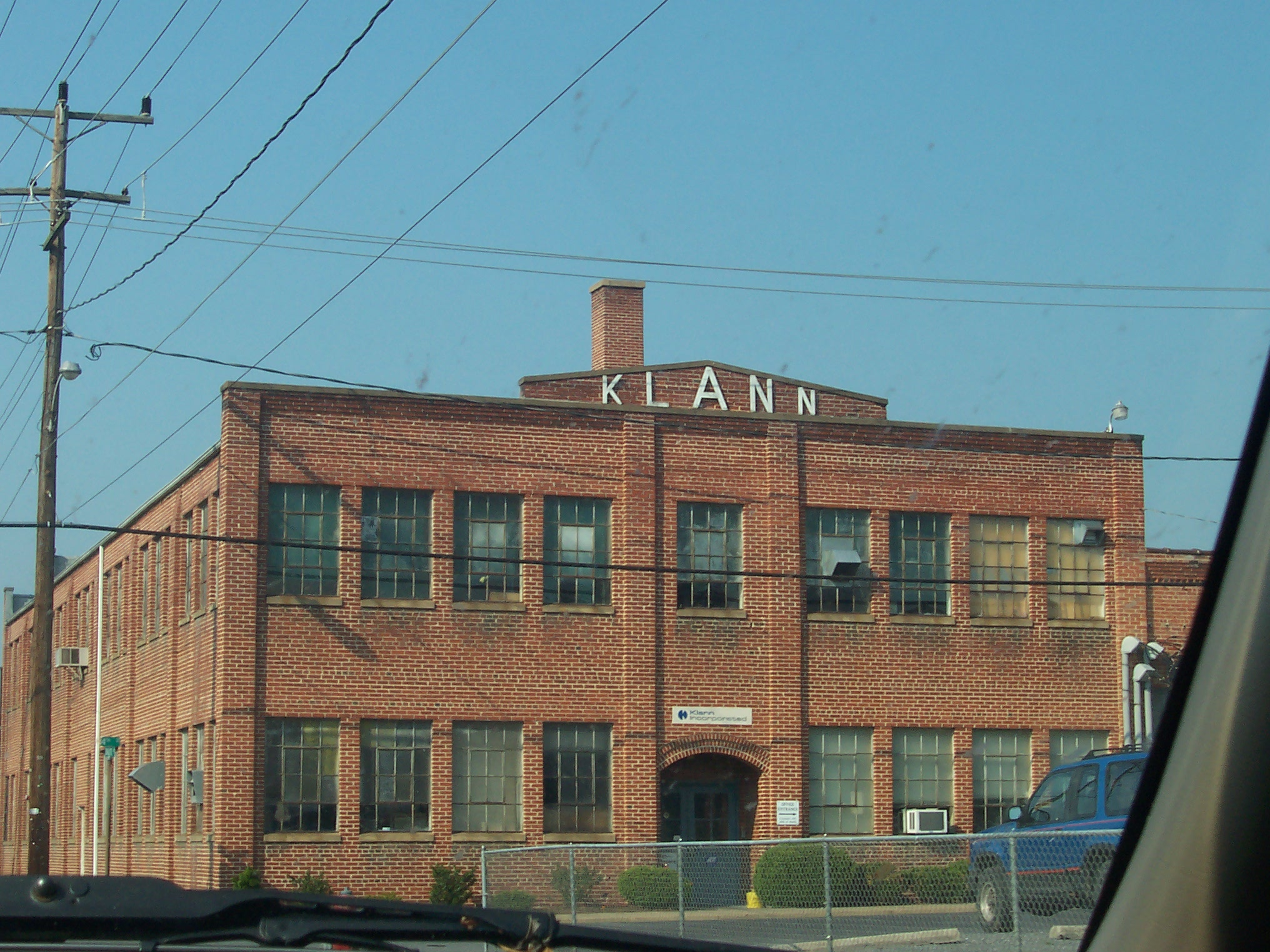
An organ manufacturing plant in Waynesboro, Virginia. This is an example of a building classified as Group F (IBC) / Industrial (NFPA 101).

Building occupancy classifications refer to categorizing structures based on their usage and are primarily used for building and fire code enforcement. They are usually defined by model building codes, and vary, somewhat, among them. The intended and actual usage of a structure can have impacts on requirements related to fire safety such as the number of exits, if fire sprinklers are required. It can also significant impact to building design, such structure height, the size of the building and materials the building is constructed out of.

== Classifications by organization ==
=== International Building Code ===
The International Code Council's International Building Code classifies building occupancies as follows:

- Assembly (Group A) - places used for people gathering for entertainment, worship, and eating or drinking. Examples: churches, restaurants (with 50 or more possible occupants), theaters, and stadiums. Group A is divided into five sub groups:

Group A-1 - Buildings intended for the production and viewing of performing arts or motion pictures (Examples: Movie theaters, theaters, concert halls, TV studios with a live audience)
Group A-2 - Buildings intended for food and/or drink consumption. (Examples: Restaurants, cafeterias, bars, casinos, nightclubs)
Group A-3 - Buildings intended for worship, recreation or amusement and other assembly uses not otherwise classified. Also includes sports facilities that do not include spectator seating. (Examples: Art galleries, courtrooms, funeral homes, gymnasium, ice rink, libraries, airport waiting area, house of worship.)
Group A-4 - Buildings intended for participation in or viewing of indoor sporting events and activities with spectator seating (Note: Example: Bleachers). (Examples: Arenas, indoor skating rinks, swimming pools.)
Group A-5 - Buildings intended for participation in or viewing outdoor activities. (Example: Stadiums, bleachers, amusement park structures.)

- Business (Group B) - Structures where commerce, except for display and sale of goods, occurs. Also used for government offices and higher education facilities. (Examples: Banks, insurance agencies, barber/beauty salons, government buildings, and doctor's offices)

Additionally, Assembly (Group A) occupancies that have are designed for 49 or fewer people are classified as Business (Group B).

- Educational (Group E) - Structures used for educational functions up to the 12th grade. (Examples: Elementary School, junior high school, high school.)
- Factory (Group F) - places where goods are manufactured or repaired that are classified as low and moderate hazard.

Group F-1 Moderate Hazard - Manufacture or handling of materials that are combustible (Examples: Bakeries, furniture, industrial laundries, paper mills, print works, wood/lumber.)
Group F-2 Low Hazard - Manufacture and handling of non-combustible materials. (Examples: Glass works, brick works, ice houses)

- High-Hazard (Group H) - Structures involved in the production or storage of hazardous materials, such as flammable, explosive, reactive and toxic substances. (Examples: dynamite, fireworks, gasoline, white phosphorus, hydrogen peroxide, and cyanide). This Group contains five sub-groups, depending on the type of hazardous materials being used.
- Institutional (Group I) - places where people are physically unable to leave without assistance.

Group I-1 - Structures where more than 16 people, excluding staff, live in the structure and receive care in a supervised environment and are capable of evacuating themselves. (Examples: Assisted living facilities, Group homes, alcohol/drug treatment centers)
Group I-2 - Structures where more than 5 people incapable of evacuating themselves are under medical care for periods of time exceeding 24-hours. (Examples: Hospitals, nursing homes, psychiatric facilities)
Group I-3 - Structures where more than 5 people are under security or restraint that prevents evacuation without assistance. (Examples: Correctional facilities, jails and prisons)
Group I-4 - Structures where more than 5 people are under the supervision and care of an unrelated person, for less than 24-hours. (Example: child Day cares, adult day cares)

- Mercantile (Group M) - places where goods are displayed and sold. Examples: Grocery stores, department stores, and gas stations.
- Residential (Group R) - Structures with sleeping accommodations.

Group R-1 - Structures where the people are staying for periods of less than 30 days. (Hotel and motels, boarding houses (Note: With more than 10 people))
Group R-2 - Structures with sleeping accommodations for people living for periods of more than 30 days, or that contain three or more independent living spaces. (Example: Apartment buildings; congregate (Note: Residents share common kitchen and/or bathroom facilities.) dormitories, fraternity/sororities, convents/monasteries that contain 16 or more people.)
Group R-3 - Structures with sleeping accommodations that are designed for less occupants, or one or two independent living spaces (Examples: Single family house, duplex, congregate facilities: dormitories, fraternity/sororities, convents/monasteries that contain 15 or fewer people.)
Group R-4 - Structures with sleeping accommodations for between 6 and 15 people in supervised facility receiving care, capable of evacuation without assistance. (Examples: Assisted living facilities, Group homes, alcohol/drug treatment centers)

- Storage (Group S) - places where items are stored (unless considered High-Hazard).

Group S-1 - Low-hazard - Food stuff, metal parts, glass, home appliances
Also included: Public parking garages.
Group S-2 - Moderate-hazard - Books and bulk paper, lumber, furniture, alcoholic beverages
Also included: Aircraft hangers, motor vehicle repair facilities, and self-storage facilities

- Utility and Miscellaneous (Group U) - others. (Examples: Water towers, barns, towers.)

Assembly (Group A) occupancies that are designed to hold fewer than 50 people are typically classified as being Business (Group B) occupancy, for example a small restaurant that only holds 20 people.

The distinction between Institutional (Group I) and Residential (Group R) structures is the ability of the people to evacuate themselves, without assistance from facility staff, firefighters or other individuals.

The key difference between various Residential (Group R) categories is the person's likely familiarity with the structure. Hotel guests, who may only stay in a structure for a limited time usually will be unfamiliar with the building layout and unaware of alternate exit routes in the building. People who spend longer periods of time living in a building are presumed to have more farmiliar with the building layout and aware of possible additional exits.

=== National Fire Protection Association ===
The National Fire Protection Association's Life Safety Code (NFPA 101) classifies occupancy as follows:

- Assembly - Any structure used for 50 or more people engaged in eating/drinking, entertainment, transportation or worship. (Examples: Restaurant, theater and arenas, airports, church.)

This classification also encompasses special amusement buildings, such as escape rooms and haunted houses, regardless of the number of people allowed.

- Educational - Any structure used for teaching of six or more people, through twelfth grade.
- Day Care - Any structure for 4 or more people to be cared for or supervised by anyone other than legal guardians or relatives.
- Health Care - Any structure for providing inpatient medical treatment to 4 or more people, and the people receiving care may be unable to evacuate easily or without assistance, due to various factors including age, disability or security measures. (Example: Hospitals, nursing homes.)
- Ambulatory Health Care - Any structure for outpatient medical treatment where 4 or more people may be subject to any of the following: Anastasia, any other care that renders a person incapable of evacuation without assistance.
- Detention and Correctional - Any structure used for the detainment of individuals, who are not able to evacuate unassisted due to security measures. (Example: Jail, prison, Youth detention center)
- Residential - Any structure that provides sleeping accommodations, except for health care and detention facilities. There are multiple subcategories depending on further factors.

One & Two-Family dwelling Unit - Any structure with sleeping accommodation for use by one or two groups of people. (Example: Single family home, duplex)
Lodging or Rooming House - Any building that provides sleeping accommodation for 16 or fewer people, that also lacks separate cooking space for individual people. (Example: boarding house, rooming house.)
Hotel - Any structure (or grouping of structures) that provides sleeping accommodation for 17 or more people, and the individuals staying for short durations. (Example: hotel, motel, hostel)
Dormitory - Any structure where sleeping accommodation for 17 or more people, who are not related, in one room or multiple rooms, without individual cooking facilities. (Example: boarding school and university Student_accommodation, military barracks, worker accommodation at remote sites)
Apartment Building - Any structure with three or more dwellings, with individual cooking and bathroom facilities. (Example: Apartment building)
Residential Board and Care - Any structure used for four or more people, unrelated to the owners, providing personal care. (Example: Group home, )

- Mercantile - Any structure used for the display and sale of goods. (Examples: Department store, hardware store, grocery store, gas station, book store, small restaurant (Note: Less than 50 people))
- Business - Any structure used for commerce, except for the display and sale of goods. (Examples: Law office, barber shop, accounting office, smaller college and university classrooms (Note: Less than 50 people))
- Industrial - Any structure for manufacture, processing assembling of goods. Repair of goods also included. (Example: Factory, aircraft repair hangers, power stations)
- Storage - Any structure intended for storage of goods, merchandise or vehicles. (Example: Barns, grain elevators, parking garages, warehouses)

== Other Considerations ==
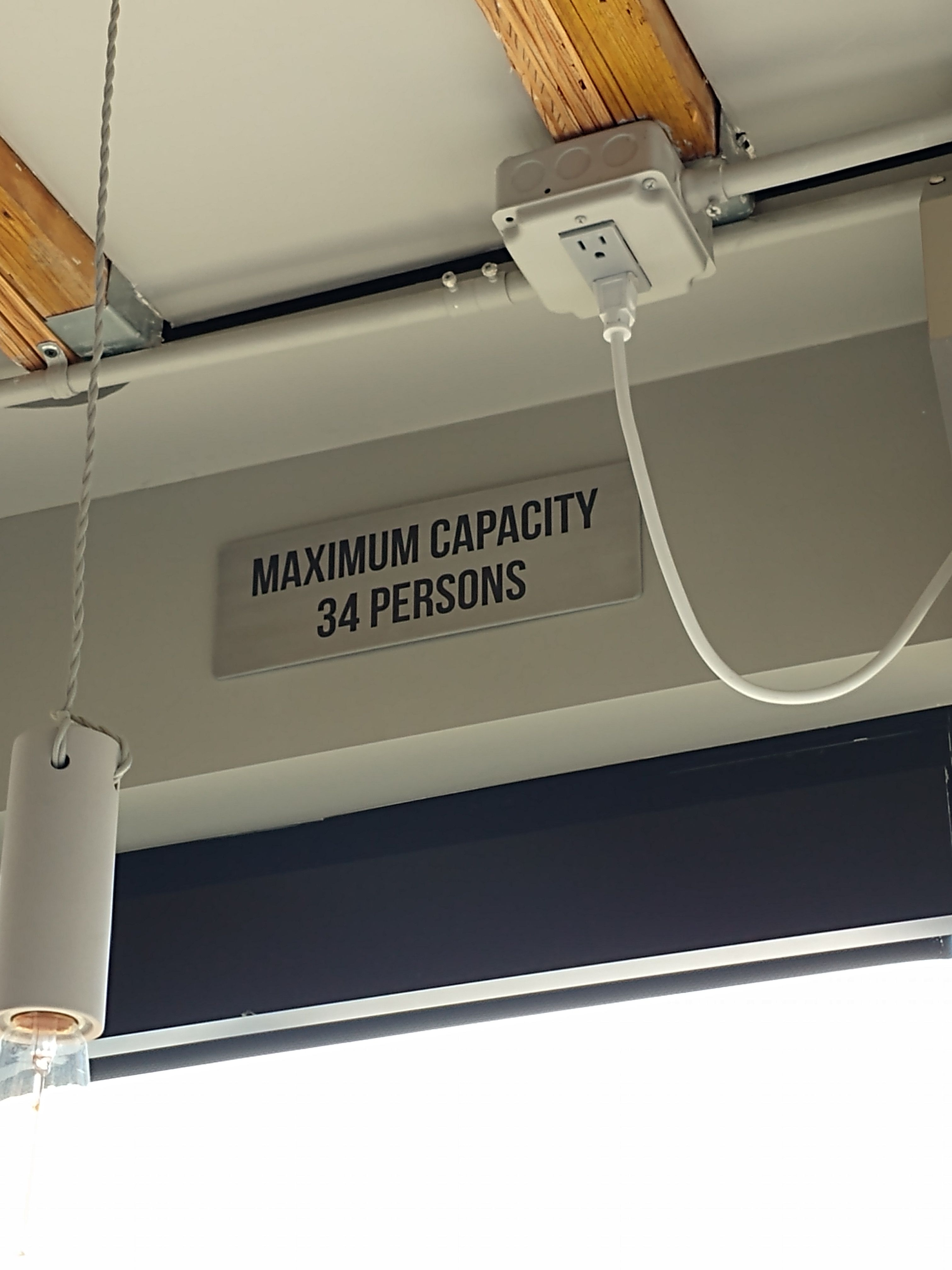
Maximum Capacity sign installed on an indoor wall.

Many buildings may have multiple occupancies. These are referred to as "mixed occupancies" and the different parts will be required to meet the codes for those specific areas. An example of this is a shopping mall with underground parking. The shopping area itself is Group M (mercantile), while the parking area would qualify as Group S (storage).

In places where more than one occupancy may apply to the same space, the stricter code is usually enforced. Smaller spaces that support an occupancy such as closets or offices are classified as the space they support. (Note: For example, a supply closet inside a law office is a business occupancy, not a storage occupancy. A manager's office in a retail store is a mercantile occupancy, not business occupancy.)

== Bibliography ==
- International Code Council (2020). 2021 International Building Code. International Code Council. ISBN 9781609839550.
- National Fire Protection Association (2024). NFPA 101 - Life Safety Code. ISBN 978-1455930562.
- Ching, Francis; Winkel, Steven (2025). Building Codes Illustrated - A Guide to Understanding the 2024 International Building Code (8th ed.). Hoboken, New Jersey: John Wiley & Sons. ISBN 9781394284849.
