= Fenestration =

Fenestration or fenestrate may refer to:

- Fenestration (architecture), relating to openings in a building
- Fenestra, in anatomy, medicine, and biology, any small opening in an anatomical structure
- Leaf window, or fenestration, a translucent or transparent area in a plant leaf
- Perforate leaf, sometimes described as fenestrate, a leaf that develops large holes as it grows
- Fenestration, holes in the rudders of some ships, supposedly giving greater control

== See also ==
- Defenestration, the act of throwing someone or something out of a window, also figuratively
- National Fenestration Rating Council, an American organization that evaluates the energy performance of fenestration products
