= National Fenestration Rating Council =

Window and door energy certification organization

The National Fenestration Rating Council (NFRC) is a United States 501(c)3 non-profit organization which sponsors an energy efficiency certification and labeling program for windows, doors, and skylights.

NFRC labels provide performance ratings for such products in five categories: U-value, Solar Heat Gain Coefficient, Visible Transmittance, Air Leakage, and Condensation Resistance. This allows architects, builders, code officials, contractors, home owners, and specifiers to compare the energy efficiency among products, and determine whether a product meets code.

The certification methods determined by NFRC are the only pathway to Energy Star and Energy Code compliance for windows in the US.

== History ==
The organization was founded in 1989 by a group of window and door industry professionals in response to mounting pressure from local and national governments to standardize energy efficiency ratings for windows and doors.

Before NFRC standardized energy efficiency ratings, each manufacturer developed their own methods. They often published misleading claims on their products' energy efficiency. For example, many manufacturers published center-of-glass u-factors rather than entire-unit u-factors, even though most of the heat loss occurs around the edges of a window.

When NFRC was formed, the members agreed to rate entire-unit u-factor information. They agreed upon standard modeling and test methods to do so. They also agreed upon the roles of simulation and modeling laboratories and independent Inspection Agencies.

NFRC published the first Certified Products Directory in 1991. The organization gained credibility and recognition with the passage of the 1992 National Energy Policy Act and the 1997 launch of the Energy Star program for windows.

In 2003, NFRC implemented one-size testing, moving away from the dual u-factor ratings that it had previously used (which were a compromise between founding manufacturers).

== Product Ratings ==
NFRC product ratings are determined through a combination of computer modeling and physical validation testing.

For a given product line, all configurations and options are modeled using THERM and WINDOW software programs, developed by Lawrence Berkeley National Laboratory. One physical unit is built and then tested in a specialized heat transfer chamber. The measured u-factor must be within 10% of the modeled value in order to validate the modeling.

Product ratings are published on a performance label attached to the unit, as well as in the Certified Products Directory.

=== Simplifications and assumptions ===
A number of simplifications and assumptions are used when modeling windows and doors for NFRC ratings. Optional accessories (such as mail slots) and most hardware can be omitted. Only continuous components are modeled.

NFRC defines a standard size for each type of window and door. This is the size that is modeled and tested.

NFRC maintains a list of standard materials whose u-factor is used in modeling. Window and door manufacturers, and their suppliers, may submit proprietary materials to be added to the list as well.

=== Inspection Agencies ===
Simulation data and physical test data are submitted to one of four Inspection Agencies, which review and approve the data.

== Code Compliance and Energy Star ==
NFRC ratings are the only pathway to energy code and Energy Star compliance for windows and doors in the US.

Energy Codes are implemented by state or local government and are mandatory requirements in those jurisdictions. States typically adopt the International Energy Conservation Code (IECC) and modify it, although some states write their own or have no energy code.

Energy Star is a voluntary program of the U.S. Environmental Protection Agency. Consumers who purchase Energy Star rated windows and doors may be eligible for a tax credit. Energy Star sets maximum u-factors and minimum or maximum Solar Heat Gain Coefficients for products depending on the type of product and the climate zone where it is installed. Version 7.0 of Energy Star will take effect on October 23, 2023.
