= Plumbing code =

Code of regulations for plumbing

A plumbing code is a code that provides regulations for the design, installation, and inspection of building plumbing and sanitary systems. In the United States, jurisdictions adopt their own codes, a majority of which are based upon national model plumbing codes. The most widely adopted plumbing code in the United States is the International Plumbing Code published by the International Code Council (ICC). This code is also used as the basis for the plumbing codes of some other countries. Another model plumbing code published and utilized widely across the United States is the Uniform Plumbing Code, published by the International Association of Plumbing and Mechanical Officials (IAPMO), a multinational operation with offices in 13 nations. IAPMO codes are developed using ANSI consensus development procedures. This code serves as the basis for the national plumbing codes in India and Indonesia.

Plumbing codes mainly focus on venting. Improper venting can release noxious fumes into homes and buildings.

== See also ==
- International Plumbing Code
- Uniform Plumbing Code
- Plumbing & Drainage Institute
