= International Plumbing Code =

Standard for plumbing systems

The International Plumbing Code (IPC) is a plumbing code that sets minimum requirements for plumbing systems in their design and function, and which sets out rules for the acceptance of new plumbing-related technologies. It is published by the International Code Council based in Washington, D.C., through the governmental consensus process and updated on a three-year cycle to include the latest advances in technology and safest plumbing practices. The current version of this code is the 2024 edition.

The IPC protects public health and safety in buildings for all water and wastewater related design, installation, and inspection by providing minimum safeguards for the general public, plumbers, residential and multi-family homes, commercial properties, schools, hospitals, and workplaces. Potable water distribution, water heaters, anti-scalding devices, back-flow prevention methods, water pipe sizing, sanitary drainage, venting, and many other plumbing related aspects are addressed in the IPC.

Plumbing codes in use in the USA: Statewide adoption of IPC Local adoption of IPC Statewide adoption of UPC Local adoption of UPC Other state or local codes used

== Adoption ==
The IPC is the most widely adopted national model plumbing code in the United States and is also used as the basis for the plumbing code of several other countries. Wide adoptions are important as they help reduce manufacturer and end-user costs by allowing the use of materials across a wide user base, thus allowing economies of scale in the production of materials used in plumbing construction.

Uniformity in the codes adopted across many areas also allows a broader sharing of best building practices and techniques and improves the transferability of experts such as architects, engineers, code officials, building inspectors, and other building professionals among those different areas. More adoptions also invite broader participation in the formulation the codes, which lends to the incorporation of the latest and best building techniques that enhance the safety of citizens in the areas using the codes.

Some jurisdictions have adopted the International Plumbing Code in a way that gives it the force of law, while others have their own codes.

== Applications ==
=== Regulatory applications ===
International Plumbing Code, are used in a variety of ways in both the public and private sectors. Most industry professionals are familiar with International Building Codes as the basis of laws and regulations in communities across the U.S. and in other countries.

=== Non-regulatory applications ===
The impact of the IPC codes extends well beyond the regulatory frameworks, as they are used in a variety of non-regulatory settings.

=== Non-regulatory uses of IPC codes ===
- Voluntary compliance programs such as those promoting sustainability, energy efficiency and disaster resistance.
- The insurance industry, to estimate and manage risk, and as a tool in underwriting and rate decisions.
- Certification and credentialing of individuals involved in the fields of building design, construction and safety.
- Certification of building and construction-related products.
- U.S. federal agencies, to guide construction in an array of government-owned properties.
- Facilities management.
- Used to benchmark best practices for designers and builders,
- Used by plumbers who are engaged in projects in jurisdictions that do not have a formal regulatory system or a governmental enforcement mechanism.
- College, university and professional school textbooks and curricula.
- Reference works related to building design and construction.

== See also ==
- International Code Council
- International Mechanical Code
- International Fuel Gas Code
