= Buildings Energy Efficiency Ordinance =

Legislation of Hong Kong

Legislative Council of Hong Kong
- Long title: An Ordinance to require compliance with codes of practice concerning the energy efficiency of air-conditioning installations, electrical installations, lift and escalator installations and lighting installations and energy audits in respect of several types of buildings and to provide for related matters.
- Citation: Cap. 610
- Enacted by: Legislative Council of Hong Kong
- Commenced: 3 December 2010

Legislative history
- Introduced by: Secretary for the Environment Edward Yau
- Introduced: 4 December 2009
- First reading: 9 December 2009
- Second reading: 24 November 2010
- Third reading: 24 November 2010
- Committee report: Report of the Bills Committee on Buildings Energy Efficiency Bill

Amended by
- 2012, 2013, 2017
- Status: Current legislation

To improve building energy efficiency, the Hong Kong Government formulated a Buildings Energy Efficiency Ordinance (建築物能源效益條例) which was passed by the Legislative Council in November 2010. Under the Ordinance, certain prescribed types of buildings have to comply with Building Energy Code (BEC) and/or Energy Audit Code (EAC). The Ordinance came into full operation on 21 September 2012.

Under the Ordinance, building services installations including electrical, air-conditioning, lighting and lift and escalator installations in newly constructed buildings are required to meet the minimum energy efficiency standards and requirements as specified in the Code of Practice for Energy Efficiency of Building Services Installation. Existing buildings will also be required to comply with the requirement when undergoing major retrofitting works. The standards stipulated in the Code, which was published in February 2012 are more stringent than those in the last version promulgated in 2007, which have been implemented on a voluntary basis. Most of the new standards are comparable to those adopted in the US, Europe and the Asia-Pacific region, while some standards are not specified in overseas jurisdictions.

In addition, the central building services installations of commercial buildings and commercial portions of composite buildings are required to carry out energy audits in accordance with the Code of Practice for Building Energy Audit every 10 years, and the results have to be displayed in a conspicuous position at the main entrance of the buildings concerned for public inspection.

Implementation of the Ordinance is operated by the Electrical and Mechanical Services Department
