= International Green Construction Code =

The International Green Construction Code (IGCC) is a set of guidelines that aim to improve the sustainability and environmental performance of buildings during their design, construction, and operation. It was introduced by the International Code Council (ICC), a non-profit organization that provides building safety and fire prevention codes for the United States and other countries. It is a model code designed to be mandatory where it is implemented.

The IgCC is the first of its kind, a national green code that builds upon pre-existing codes such as the IBC, IECC and other 'I-Codes' by adding extra green provisions.

== History ==
The International Code Council (ICC) developed the IgCC in 2009 (Public Version 1.0). Since then, there have been five editions of the code, with the most recent being the 2021 IgCC. The 2018 version of the code was co-developed by the ICC and the American Society of Heating, Refrigeration and AirConditioning Engineers (ASHRAE). Chapter 1 of the code is handled by the ICC and the remaining technical content is based on standards developed by ASHRAE in ANSI/ASHRAE/ICC/USGBC/IES Standard 189.1.

The IGCC initiative began in 2009 with cooperating sponsors American Institute of Architects (AIA) and ASTM International. The AIA has been involved with green initiatives and sustainability movements before, including its 2030 carbon neutrality challenge. ASTM's involvement with the IGCC is an attempt to ensure that the code will use certain voluntary consensus standards recognized by the industry. The release of Public Version 1.0 was announced by the International Code Council on March 11, 2010. Public Version 2.0 was released on November 19, 2010.

== Goals ==
The IGCC was developed in response to the growing demand for environmentally friendly buildings, as well as the need for consistent standards across the construction industry. The code was designed to be flexible, allowing for local adaptation and customization to meet the specific needs of different regions. It includes measures that promote better indoor air quality, conserve natural resources, enhance connections between buildings and their surrounding communities, and encourage walkability. The IgCC was designed to be used alongside other codes and standards, such as the International Energy Conservation Code (IECC) and ASHRAE 90.1, and is the result of a partnership between the public and private sectors. It is intended to provide a uniform green code that can be adopted by governments without the need for them to incur the cost of developing their own code. Green building strategies ensure the health and safety of people, as well as provide resilience to natural disasters, climate change, and resource consumption and management. Furthermore, these strategies can reduce service interruptions due to unexpected events, providing an extra layer of protection.

The goal of the IGCC is to decrease energy usage and carbon footprints along with several other issues.

- The code addresses site development and land use, including the preservation of natural and material resources as part of the process.
- Enforcement of the code will improve indoor air quality and support the use of energy-efficient appliances, renewable energy systems, water resource conservation, rainwater collection and distribution systems, and the recovery of used water, also known as greywater.
- The IGCC emphasizes building performance, including features such as a requirement for building system performance verification along with building owner education, to ensure the best energy-efficient practices are being carried out.
- A key feature of the new code is a section devoted to "jurisdictional electives", which will allow customization of the code beyond its baseline provisions to address local priorities and conditions.

== Scope ==
In the 2018 version, the code applies to the following types of projects:

- New buildings and their systems
- New portions of buildings
- New systems and equipment in existing buildings
- Relocated buildings

The code does not apply to:

- Single-family homes
- Multi-family buildings of three or less stories
- Mobile homes
- Modular homes
- Building projects that do not use any of the following:
  - Electricity
  - Fossil Fuels
  - Water

== Chapters ==
The most widely implemented version of the IgCC - the 2012 version - contains 12 chapters. Each chapter focuses on different requirements, as outlined below:

=== Chapter 1 “Administration” ===
Chapter 1 of the IgCC sets forth the administrative criteria for the code, which is applicable to all occupancies except low-rise residential occupancies. It references the IBC for establishing and operating administrative functions, such as enforcement and appeals and establishes the rights and privileges of the design professional, contractor, and property owner.

=== Chapter 2 “Definitions” ===
Chapter 2 of the IgCC provides definitions of terms specific to the code, which are shown in italics whenever they appear. The meaning of some of these terms may differ from their usual interpretation, so users should consult Chapter 2 regularly to ensure they interpret them correctly.

=== Chapter 3 “Jurisdictional Requirements and Life Cycle Assessment” ===
The IgCC code is designed to be flexible in order to allow communities to customize the code to their unique environmental and regional goals. Table 302.1 provides a list of optional, enhanced performance features that become enforceable in the jurisdiction when adopted. The design team can select a minimum number of criteria from a list of options with the agreement of the owner. Certain requirements listed in Table 302.1 may not be appropriate for all jurisdictions, which is why they were not included in the baseline requirements of the IgCC. The following requirement choices are outlined in the table:

==== Scope ====
- Option to require the code to be applied to certain residential buildings

==== Site Development and Land use ====
- Flood hazard area preservation
- Surface water protection
- Conservation area
- Agricultural land
- Greenfield sites
- High-occupancy parking
- Low-emission and hybrid vehicle parking
- Light pollution control

==== Material Resource Conservation and Efficiency ====
- Minimum percentage of waste diverted from landfills (option to choose from 50% to 75%)

==== Energy Conservation, Efficiency, and CO_{2} Emission Reduction ====
- Requirement for enhanced energy performance, indicating a zEPI of 46 or less
- Automated demand response infrastructure

==== Water Resource Conservation, Quality, and Comfort ====
- Municipal reclaimed water

==== Indoor Environmental Quality and Comfort ====
- Post-Construction Pre-Occupancy Baseline IAQ Testing
- Sound transmission and sound levels

==== Existing Buildings ====
- Evaluation of existing buildings
- Post Certificate of Occupancy zEPI, energy demand, and CO_{2}e emissions reporting

Note: in the 2012 version, the number of required criteria additions from Chapter 3 was up to the design team, but in the 2015 version this number was set to a minimum of three.

=== Chapter 4 “Site Development and Land Use” ===
Chapter 4 of the code establishes a set of requirements for the development and maintenance of buildings and building sites with the goal of conserving natural resources and promoting environmentally responsible land use and development. These requirements include site inventory and assessment, storm water management, potable water uses for landscape irrigation and fountains, vegetation and soil protection, diversion of debris and soils, bicycle paths and storage, heat island effect mitigation, and light pollution from buildings.

=== Chapter 5 “Material Resource Conservation and Efficiency” ===
Chapter 5 of the code encourages the development of buildings that are environmentally friendly and resource efficient. This includes material selection, recycling, reuse, renewability, toxicity, and durability. Section 505 requires a minimum of 55 percent of the material used in a project to be either used, recycled, recyclable, bio-based, or indigenous, unless a whole building life cycle analysis is conducted in accordance with Section 303.

=== Chapter 6 “Energy Conservation, Efficiency and CO_{2}e Emission Reduction” ===
Chapter 6 outlines requirements for building designs, constructions, commissioning and operations that promote the effective use of energy. It provides two approaches to meet this goal: prescriptive and performance-based. The prescriptive path provides specific requirements for building envelopes, mechanical systems, service water heating systems and electrical power/lighting systems. The performance-based pathway requires modeled requirements and plug load controls. Other requirements include energy metering, monitoring, and reporting; specification of certain appliances and equipment; building renewable energy systems; and energy systems commissioning.

=== Chapter 7 “Water Resource Conservation, Quality and Efficiency” ===
Chapter 7 of the code is intended to conserve water, protect its quality, and ensure safe consumption. It requires metering for indoor, outdoor, and wastewater uses, as well as maximum flow rates for water-based heating, ventilation, and air conditioning systems. The chapter also includes requirements for water treatment systems, rainwater harvesting, greywater systems, and reclaimed water systems.

=== Chapter 8 “Indoor Environmental Quality and Comfort” ===
Chapter 8 is designed to ensure that a building's interior environment is suitable for the health of its occupants. It mandates an air quality management plan, ventilation during the construction phase, natural light for certain occupancies, and prohibits smoking indoors. It also limits pollutants in certain rooms, requires filters for air conditioning systems, and regulates emissions from fireplaces, fuel-burning appliances, and gas appliances. It does not allow the use of urea-formaldehyde foam insulation and materials containing asbestos.

=== Chapter 9 “Commissioning, Operation and Maintenance” ===
Chapter 9 of the building code requires owners and facility managers to operate and maintain buildings in a manner that will achieve the designed performance goals. It implements procedures for pre- and post- occupancy commissioning to evaluate the building's operation, performance, and maintenance. The construction commissioning can be done by the architect, unlike the LEED process.

=== Chapter 10 “Existing Buildings” ===
This chapter sets out the requirements for alterations, repairs, additions, maintenance, operation, and changes of occupancy for existing buildings and structures.

=== Chapter 11 “Existing Building Site Development” ===
This chapter covers any changes, repairs, maintenance, and operation to existing building sites, or any improvements to the site, as well as any additions or changes of occupancy within the current buildings on the site.

=== Chapter 12 “Referenced Standards” ===
Chapter 12 of the IgCC provides a list of the standards referenced in different chapters in alphabetical order, according to the acronym of the organization that issued them.

== Adoption ==
Below is the list of cities which adopted each version of the IgCC:

International Green Construction Code (IgCC) Adoption in the United States
State	City/Town	Version	Notes
Arizona	Scottsdale	2015	
Arizona	Phoenix	Other	adopted its own standard based on the National Green Building Standard for residential construction
Arizona	Kayenta Township (Tribal Community)	2010 IgCC public Version 2.0	
Colorado	Carbondale	2012	
Colorado	Fort Collins	Other	Commercial Building Code Green Building Amendments (based on IgCC)
District of Columbia	District of Columbia	2012	
Florida	Boynton Beach	2018	Sustainable Development Standards, based on 2018 version (increase in existing building size by 5,000 SF or development of new site)
Idaho	Boise	2012	
Illinois	Carbondale	2018	Applies only to commercial buildings and will come into effect before the end of the year.
Maryland	Baltimore	2012	(Mandatory - All buildings)
Maryland	Rockville	2012	(Mandatory – All commercial and multi-family buildings)
North Carolina	[Statewide]	2015	North Carolina Building Code Council adopted Rainwater Collection and Distribution Systems section of the 2009 IgCC public version 1.0
New Hampshire	Keene	N/A	(All projects awarded urban development zone incentives)
Rhode Island	[Statewide]	2012	Adoption for the design and construction of all major public facilities
Oregon	[Statewide]	2021	Commercial Reach Code in Oregon
Texas	Dallas	2012	Mandatory for all new structures, excludes all existing buildings
Washington	Richland	IgCC public version 1.0	Optional reference document for the construction of commercial buildings

== Comparison to LEED ==
The IgCC shares some similarities with the Leadership in Energy and Environmental Design (LEED) certification. Both the IgCC and LEED provide frameworks for designing and constructing buildings in a way that minimizes their environmental impact. However, there are some key differences between the two programs. For example, the IgCC is focused specifically on construction, whereas LEED covers the entire lifecycle of a building, including its operation and maintenance. Additionally, the IgCC is a model code, which means that it has the force of law in jurisdictions that adopt it, whereas LEED is a voluntary certification program that developers choose to pursue. More recently, the 2018 version was designed to mesh with LEED. Simply complying with the code meant meeting all of the LEED prerequisites, as well as earning 20 points worth of credit, making LEED certification easier later. However, this raises the question of whether it necessary to have a separate code if it achieves the same outcome as a LEED certification. Some jurisdictions already require LEED for certain projects, and for them it may seem redundant to adopt the IgCC.

== Implementation ==
The work of the Code Council/AIA/ASTM team in developing the IGCC was joined with the Standard developed by the American Society of Heating, Refrigerating and Air-Conditioning Engineers (ASHRAE), the U.S. Green Building Council (USGBC) and the Illuminating Engineering Society (IES). The IGCC will reference the Public Version 1.0/ ANSI/ASHRAE/USGBC/IES Standard 189.1-2009 for the Design of High-Performance Green Buildings, Except Low-Rise Residential Buildings, as an alternative jurisdictional compliance option within the IGCC. The participants in designing this Standard also voiced their support for the new IGCC and its potential to contribute to a more sustainable built environment across America and around the globe can adopt the code immediately to reduce energy usage and their jurisdictions carbon footprint. The IGCC also addresses residential construction by referencing the ICC 700-2008 National Green Building Standard developed by the National Association of Home Builders and the International Code Council.

== Limitations ==
The latest version of the International Green Construction Code (IgCC) has been criticized for being too stringent and unrealistic, making it difficult for most construction projects to comply with its requirements. As a result, officials have been reluctant to adopt the code, and it has only been implemented in a small number of cities in the United States. Some have argued that the 2012 and 2015 versions of the IgCC are better model codes, as they offer more flexibility to jurisdictions and are more practical to implement in most places. There have also been concerns that certain provisions of the newer versions of the IgCC are "anti-redevelopment," making it difficult for new construction to take place. Some have characterized the code as "unbuildable," suggesting that it may be too ambitious and impractical to be applied in most situations. It is important to have a construction code that is followed by all new construction projects, but there may be more effective ways to achieve this goal.

Adopting new technologies or practices can be difficult due to their perceived complexity, and this can be an obstacle to the adoption of the International Green Construction Code (IgCC). In addition to complexity, the cost of implementing the code is a major factor for cities and states to consider. This cost includes the expense of incorporating the code into local regulations, as well as the cost of hiring architects and other professionals who are familiar with the code and its requirements. This may create an additional burden for developers who must bear the costs of complying with the code.

Developers face an additional financial burden when employing passive design methods, as they must pay an architect to design an environmentally friendly building without any subsidies to offset the costs. Furthermore, building codes often fail to accommodate more innovative approaches to promoting green design, such as conserving energy, reducing waste, and improving air quality – some of which may be more cost-effective than the methods prescribed by the code. The IgCC addressed some aspects of this issue in its 2015 version by introducing a compliance pathway based on the energy use of the building over a three-year period, where a building will be required to meet baseline requirements outlined in the International Energy Conservation Code (IECC). This allows developers to make the best decisions for their projects, rather than being restricted to pre-defined parameters. Using a similar outcome-based approach could prove useful in increasing the attractiveness of IgCC to jurisdictions and developers alike. In order to make the code more realistic and applicable to most places, it is important to consider the input of local stakeholders and make sure the code is tailored to their specific needs.
