= International Mechanical Code =

The International Mechanical Code (IMC) is a consensus national model code concentrating on the installation and safety of heating, ventilation, and air conditioning systems. It is published by the International Code Council (ICC) through a governmental consensus process and is updated on a three-year cycle to include the latest advances in technology and safest mechanical practices. The current version of this code is the 2024 edition. The IMC protects public health and safety for all building heating, cooling and ventilation related design, installation and inspection by providing minimum safeguards for people at homes, schools, and workplaces. Fuel burning appliances, cooling systems, heating systems appliance venting, location and protection of appliances and many other such issues are addressed in the IMC.

The IMC is the most widely used mechanical code in the United States and is also used as the basis for the mechanical code of several other countries.

== See also ==
- International Code Council
- International Plumbing Code
- International Fuel Gas Code
- Uniform Mechanical Code
