= Uniform Building Code =

Model building code

The Uniform Building Code (UBC) was a building code used primarily in the western United States.

== History ==
The UBC was first published in 1927 by the International Conference of Building Officials, which was based in Whittier, California. It was intended to promote public safety and provided standardized requirements for safe construction which would not vary from city to city as had previously been the case.

Updated editions of the code were published approximately every three years until 1997, which was the final version of the code. The UBC was replaced in 2000 by the new International Building Code (IBC) published by the International Code Council (ICC). The ICC was a merger of three predecessor organizations which published three different building codes. These were:

- International Conference of Building Officials (ICBO) Uniform Building Code
- Building Officials and Code Administrators International (BOCA) The BOCA National Building Code
- Southern Building Code Congress International (SBCCI) Standard Building Code

The new ICC was intended to provide consistent standards for safe construction and eliminate differences between the three different predecessor codes. It is primarily used in the United States.

Previous versions of the UBC are as follows: 1927 (first version), 1935, 1937, 1940, 1943, 1946, 1949, 1952, 1955, 1958, 1961, 1964, 1967, 1970, 1973, 1976, 1979, 1982, 1985, 1988, 1991, 1994, 1997 (last version).
