= Model building code =

A model building code is a building code that is developed and maintained by a standards organization independent of the jurisdiction responsible for enacting the building code. A local government can choose to adopt a model building code as its own. This saves local governments the expense and trouble of developing their own codes. Many smaller governments lack the expertise to do so.

According to the Cato Institute, "Building code rules can add significantly to the cost of constructing new housing. Codes have ballooned in length and complexity", additionally, "...building code changes adopted just since 2012 account for 11 percent of the cost of building new apartments..."

== Overview ==
The concept of the model building codes has been applied since the early 1900s in the countries where regulation of building construction is a responsibility of the local authorities. The popularity of model building codes can be attributed to two factors: (a) the developing of proprietary building codes is prohibitively expensive, and (b) the ability of the model codes to accommodate local conditions. Since modern building regulations are very complex, their development and effective maintenance are far beyond the technical and financial capabilities of most jurisdictions. Rather than drafting its own building codes, a local authority might choose to use the model building codes instead. The model building codes are either adopted (accepted without modifications) or adapted (modified) to a particular jurisdiction and then enforced by the adopting authority.

Model building codes are developed by standards organizations through a network of development committees with representatives from the various affected entities, both government and private. This method allows the pooling of financial and intellectual resources to produce codes that remain current and technically sound. The model code developers are constantly working to update their codes to incorporate latest research results and building technologies.

The model code developers are generally funded by the sales of the model codes, the reprint royalties, and the consulting services they may offer to the adopting authorities and code users.

== Application ==
=== United States ===
In the United States, model building codes are adopted by the state governments, counties, fire districts, and municipalities. A number of federal agencies—including the U.S. Department of Defense, the National Park Service, the Department of State and the Forest Service—use private-sector model codes for projects funded by the federal government.

Normally, model building codes have a 3–5 year update cycle. However, due to the length of time that it takes for a jurisdiction to review and approve a new code, the currently enforced version of the local code is often not the most recent edition of the model building code. On which the adopted code is based.

Also, when any given jurisdiction adopts a model building code, it adopts a specific edition of the model code (e.g. the 1997 Uniform Building Code or the 2006 International Building Code), which then becomes the law of that jurisdiction. As a result of this practice, the adopted codes are not automatically updated. When a new edition of the model code is released by the model code developer, the adopting authority may choose to ignore it and continue using the older version of the model code it adopted. Otherwise, the jurisdiction must vote to update its code and bring its inspectors up to date on the changes being made to the code. Most jurisdictions update their codes regularly to avoid backlash from architects and building contractors, who respond to outdated codes by seeking variances to permit the use of more efficient design solutions and technologies accepted in areas using more modern codes.

The model codes may either be adopted outright as the building codes for a jurisdiction, or they may be adopted with amendments or additional rules. In some cases, the amendments or additional requirements and exemptions are issued as a separate document or, in other cases, the jurisdiction may print, under its own title, a merged code, incorporating all the local revisions. For example, the City of Los Angeles 2011 Building Code is based on the 2009 International Building Code, which is a model code developed by the International Code Council (ICC).

In the wake of the 2002 case Veeck v. Southern Building Code Congress Int'l, Inc., the organization Public Resource has published a substantial portion of the enacted building codes on-line, and they are available as .pdf's which are freely downloadable. The Veeck case has had the effect of placing the text of the adopted model codes into the public domain, although the model codes themselves, until they are adopted into law, are not in the public domain.

Some model building codes commonly used in the United States:

- International Building Code by the International Code Council
- NFPA 5000 by the National Fire Protection Association
- National Electrical Code by the National Fire Protection Association
