= International Fuel Gas Code =

The International Fuel Gas Code (IFGC) is published by the International Code Council through the governmental consensus process and is updated on a three-year cycle to include the latest advances in technology and safest mechanical practices. The current version of this code is the 2021 edition. The IFGC is published in partnership with the American Gas Association (AGA). The IFGC protects public health and safety for all building systems that use fuel gas for the design, installation and inspection of such systems by providing minimum safeguards for people at homes, schools and workplace. Fuel burning appliances, furnaces, chimneys, vents, gas pipe sizing and many other such issues are addressed in the IFGC.
