= International Code Council =

Nonprofit building standards organization

- Founded: 1994; 32 years ago
- Area served: United States
- Website: www.iccsafe.org

The International Code Council (ICC) is an American nonprofit standards organization founded in 1994 through the merger of three regional model code organizations in the U.S. construction industry. Since 2023, ICC's headquarters has been based at Capitol Crossing in Washington, D.C.

The organization creates what it calls the International Building Code (IBC) and International Residential Code (IRC), two model building codes, which have been adopted for use as a base code standard by most jurisdictions within the United States. The ICC's model codes have been criticized for inflating housing costs and reducing housing supply in the United States through arbitrary and stringent standards that do little for safety and are out of sync with best practices in other countries. The IBC has contributed to the spread of 5-over-1 type of buildings across the US and contributed to a lack of medium-density housing (so-called "missing middle housing").

Despite its name, the International Code Council is not an international organization, its codes are rarely used outside the United States, and its regulations do not consistently follow international best practices. According to the ICC, the IBC is intended to protect public health and safety while avoiding both unnecessary costs and preferential treatment of specific materials or methods of construction. According to the American Libertarian think tank Cato Institute, "Building code rules can add significantly to the cost of constructing new housing. Codes have ballooned in length and complexity", additionally, "...building code changes adopted just since 2012 account for 11 percent of the cost of building new apartments..."

According to Open Secrets, expenditures on lobbying for the ICC in 2024 was $712,500.

== ICC Model Codes ==
- International Building Code (IBC)
- International Residential Code (IRC)
- International Fire Code (IFC)
- International Plumbing Code (IPC)
- International Mechanical Code (IMC)
- International Fuel Gas Code (IFGC)
- International Energy Conservation Code (IECC)
- ICC Performance Code (ICCPC)
- International Wildland Urban Interface Code (IWUIC)
- International Existing Building Code (IEBC)
- International Property Maintenance Code (IPMC)
- International Private Sewage Disposal Code (IPSDC)
- International Zoning Code (IZC)
- International Green Construction Code (IgCC)
- International Swimming Pool and Spa Code (ISPSC)

== History ==
Since the early twentieth century, the system of building regulations in the United States has been based on model building codes developed by three regional model code groups and adopted in a piecemeal fashion by local and state governments. The National Codes developed by the Building Officials Code Administrators International (BOCA) were used on the East Coast and throughout the Midwest of the United States. The Standard Codes from the Southern Building Code Congress International (SBCCI) were used in the Southeast. The Uniform Codes published by the International Conference of Building Officials (ICBO) were used primarily throughout the West Coast and across a large swath of the middle of the country to most of the Midwest.

In 1972, BOCA, SBCCI, and ICBO created the Council of American Building Officials (CABO) to prepare a national building code for residential construction. CABO's One and Two Family Dwelling Code was adopted by only a handful of U.S. jurisdictions; the rest preferred to stick with the regional building codes. In 1994, BOCA, SBCCI, and ICBO merged to form the International Code Council (ICC) in order to develop a comprehensive set of building codes that would have no regional limitations: the International Codes (or I-Codes). There were several free trade developments that led to the founding of ICC: the ratification of the North American Free Trade Agreement, the formation of the European Union, and the EU's efforts to unify standards for building design, construction, and materials across the European Single Market (the Eurocodes). All these developments caused American construction professionals and manufacturers to push for a nationwide building code in the United States, so that they could waste less time and money complying with different provisions of the regional codes and could instead focus on compliance with other countries' building codes in order to compete internationally for construction projects.

After three years of extensive research and development, the first edition of the International Building Code was published in 2000. A new code edition has since been released every three years thereafter. The code was patterned on the three legacy codes previously developed by the organizations that had formed ICC. By the year 2000, ICC had completed the International Codes series and ceased development of the legacy codes in favor of their national successors.

The word "International" in the names of the ICC and all three of its predecessors, as well as the IBC and other ICC products, despite all 18 of the company's board members being residents of the United States, reflects the fact that a number of other countries in the Caribbean and Latin America had already begun to rely on model building codes developed in the United States rather than developing their own. Bermuda was using codes by BOCA and Western Samoa was using ICBO codes. ICC was thus aware that it was writing model codes for an international audience. "Calling it 'international' keeps it from being called the 'U.S. Building Code,'" explains Bill Tangye, SBCCI Chief Executive Officer.

=== Legacy codes ===
- BOCA National Building Code (BOCA/NBC) by the Building Officials Code Administrators International (BOCA)
- Uniform Building Code (UBC) by the International Conference of Building Officials (ICBO)
- Standard Building Code (SBC) by the Southern Building Code Congress International (SBCCI)

=== Competing codes and final adoption ===
The National Fire Protection Association initially joined ICC in a collective effort to develop the International Fire Code (IFC). This effort fell apart at the completion of the first draft of the document. Subsequent efforts by ICC and NFPA to reach agreement on this and other documents were unsuccessful, resulting in a series of disputes between the two organizations. After several failed attempts to find common ground with the ICC, NFPA withdrew from participation in development of the International Codes and joined with the International Association of Plumbing and Mechanical Officials (IAPMO), the American Society of Heating, Refrigerating and Air-Conditioning Engineers (ASHRAE) and the Western Fire Chiefs Association to create an alternative set of codes. First published in 2002, the code set named the Comprehensive Consensus Codes, or C3, includes the NFPA 5000 building code as its centerpiece and several companion codes such as the National Electrical Code, NFPA 101 Life Safety Code, Uniform Plumbing Code, Uniform Mechanical Code, and NFPA 1. Unlike the IBC, the NFPA 5000 conformed to ANSI-established policies and procedures for the development of voluntary consensus standards.

The NFPA's move to introduce a competing building standard received strong opposition from powerful trade groups such as the American Institute of Architects (AIA), BOMA International and the National Association of Home Builders (NAHB). After several unsuccessful attempts to encourage peaceful cooperation between NFPA and ICC and resolution of their disputes over code development, a number of organizations, including AIA, BOMA and two dozen commercial real estate associations, founded the Get It Together coalition, which repeatedly urged NFPA to abandon code development related to NFPA 5000 and to work with ICC to integrate the other NFPA codes and standards into the ICC family of codes.

Initially, under Governor Gray Davis, California had adopted the NFPA 5000 codes as a baseline for the future California Building Code, but in 2003, Davis was recalled from office and Arnold Schwarzenegger was elected to replace him. Upon taking office, Schwarzenegger rescinded Davis's directive, and the state adopted the IBC instead. Adopting NFPA 5000 would have caused a disparity between California and the majority of other states which had adopted the IBC.

== Overview ==
A large portion of the International Building Code deals with fire prevention. It differs from the related International Fire Code in that the IBC addresses fire prevention in regard to construction and design and the fire code addresses fire prevention in regard to the operation of a completed and occupied building. For example, the building code sets criteria for the number, size and location of exits in the design of a building while the fire code requires the exits of a completed and occupied building to be unblocked. The building code also deals with access for the disabled and structural stability (including earthquakes). The International Building Code applies to all structures in areas where it is adopted, except for one and two family dwellings (see International Residential Code).

Parts of the code reference other codes including the International Plumbing Code, the International Mechanical Code, the National Electrical Code, and various National Fire Protection Association standards. Therefore, if a municipality adopts the International Building Code, it also adopts those parts of other codes referenced by the IBC. Often, the plumbing, mechanical, and electric codes are adopted along with the building code.

The code book itself (2000 edition) totals over 700 pages and chapters include:

- Building occupancy classifications
- Building heights and areas
- Interior finishes
- Foundation, wall, and roof construction
- Fire protection systems (sprinkler system requirements and design)
- Materials used in construction
- Elevators and escalators
- Already existing structures
- Means of egress (see below)

== Means of egress ==
The phrase "means of egress" refers to the ability to exit the structure, primarily in the event of an emergency, such as a fire. Specifically, a means of egress is broken into three parts: the exit access, the exit, and the exit discharge (the path to a safe area outside).

The code specifies the number of exits required for a structure based on its intended use and the occupancy load (number of people who could be in the place at one time) as well as their relative locations. It also deals with special needs, such as hospitals, nursing homes, and prisons where evacuating people may have special requirements. In some instances, requirements are made based on possible hazards (such as in industries) where flammable or toxic chemicals will be in use.

== Existing structures ==
Building code requirements generally apply to the construction of new buildings and alterations or additions to existing buildings, changes in the use of buildings, and the demolition of buildings or portions of buildings at the ends of their useful or economic lives. As such, building codes obtain their effect from the voluntary decisions of property owners to erect, alter, add to, or demolish a building in a jurisdiction where a building code applies, because these circumstances routinely require a permit. The plans are subject to review for compliance with current building codes as part of the permit application process. Generally, building codes are not otherwise retroactive except to correct an imminent hazard. However, accessibility standards – similar to those referenced in the model building codes – may be retroactive subject to the applicability of the Americans with Disabilities Act (ADA) which is a federal civil rights requirement.

Alterations and additions to an existing building must usually comply with all new requirements applicable to their scope as related to the intended use of the building as defined by the adopted code (e.g., Section 101.2 Scope, International Building Code, any version). Some changes in the use of a building often expose the entire building to the requirement to comply fully with provisions of the code applicable to the new use because the applicability of the code is use-specific. A change in use usually changes the applicability of code requirements and as such, will subject the building to review for compliance with the currently applicable codes (refer to Section 3408, Change of Occupancy, International Building Code – 2009).

Existing buildings are not exempt from new requirements, with the IBC publishing a Building Code for existing buildings. Existing Building Codes are intended to provide alternative approaches to repair, alteration, and additions to existing buildings. At minimum, this ensures that any new construction maintains the current level of compliance or are improved to meet basic safety levels.

Although such remedial enactments address existing conditions, they do not violate the United States Constitution's ban on the adoption of ex post facto law, as they do not criminalize or seek to punish past conduct. Such requirements merely prohibit the maintenance or continuance of conditions that would prove injurious to a member of the public or the broader public interest.

Multiple U.S. jurisdictions have found the application of new requirements to old, particularly historic buildings, challenging. New Jersey, for example, has adopted specific state amendments (see New Jersey's Rehabilitation Subcode) to provide a means of code compliance to existing structures without forcing the owner to comply with rigid requirements of the currently adopted building codes where it may be technically infeasible to do so. California has also enacted a specific historic building code (see 2001 California Historic Building Code). Other states require compliance with building and fire codes, subject to reservations, limitations, or jurisdictional discretion to protect historic building stock as a condition of nominating or listing a building for preservation or landmark status, especially where such status attracts tax credits, investment of public money, or other incentives.

The listing of a building on the National Register of Historic Places does not exempt it from compliance with state or local building code requirements.

== Updating cycle ==
Updated editions of the IBC are published on a three-year cycle (2000, 2003, 2006, 2009, 2012, 2015, 2018, 2021...). This fixed schedule has led other organizations, which produce referenced standards, to align their publishing schedule with that of the IBC, such as the NEC and California Building Code (2005, 2008, 2011, 2014, 2017...).

== Referenced standards ==
Model building codes rely heavily on referenced standards as published and promulgated by other standards organizations such as ASTM (ASTM International), ANSI (American National Standards Institute), and NFPA (National Fire Protection Association). The structural provisions rely heavily on referenced standards, such as the Minimum Design Loads for Buildings and Structures published by the American Society of Civil Engineers (ASCE-7) and the Specification for Structural Steel Buildings by the American Institute of Steel Construction (ANSI/AISC 360).

Changes in parts of the reference standard can result in disconnection between the corresponding editions of the reference standards.

== Controversies ==
=== Code development ===
A 2019 New York Times story revealed a secret agreement with the National Association of Home Builders that allowed the industry group, which represents the construction industry, to limit improvements in the code that would make buildings more environmentally sustainable and resistant to natural disasters, prompting a congressional investigation. The ICC, in response to a Congressional inquiry, vehemently denied the characterization of the agreement, noting, "While home builders are among [our code development] partners, they do not have disproportionate control of the Code Council's model code development process. On the contrary, volunteer government officials with experience and expertise exercise by far the most control in the process."

=== Double-loaded corridor floor plans ===
The IBC's means of egress requirement implies that for tall buildings, at least two staircases connected by a corridor are always required. Due to this restriction, the architectural floor plans of tall buildings that comply with the IBC are severely limited. Buildings that follow the IBC usually have windows on only one side of units, embedded in an exterior wall, while two walls divide the unit from adjacent units and the opposite wall faces the corridor.

A cascade of unintended consequences results from this requirement, such as limiting newly-built units to 1-2 bedrooms, which makes it difficult for developers to build family-sized units. Additionally, the lack of windows on the corridor side results in reduced cross-ventilation, and higher construction costs due to less efficient use of space.

As of 2024, there are ongoing discussions about modifying the IBC to permit higher single-stair buildings, which can have more diverse designs. The IBC agreed to allow single-stair buildings up to four stories in its 2027 code, a compromise of the six stories requested by some advocates.

=== Copyright ===
Multiple states and municipalities in the United States of America adopt the Code Council's codes by reference, with and without modifications.

Since the 2000s US case law has increasingly focused on whether copyright’s fair use doctrine permits public-access groups to make incorporated by reference (IBR) standards available online. To date, courts have not reached a consensus on whether technical standards remain protected by copyright after they are incorporated into law; however recent ruling have generally not been in favor of standards organizations.

In the wake of the Federal copyright case Veeck v. Southern Building Code Congress Int'l, Inc., the organization Public Resource has published a substantial portion of the enacted building codes online, and they are available as PDFs.

In 2017, ICC sued a private, for-profit company, UpCodes, in response to that company's posting of copies of ICC's model codes. Following discovery, Judge Victor Marrero issued a ruling finding for UpCodes on a number of ICC's claims of copyright infringement, holding that, as UpCodes was uploading the codes as codes enacted into law, the government edicts doctrine prevented ICC from enforcing its copyright in the model codes to prevent the uploads. After ordering a trial, ICC sued in a separate action, alleging false-advertising and unfair-competition claims; that separate lawsuit was dismissed in 2021.

In 2024, a bill introduced in the 118th Congress, the Pro Codes Act (H.R. 1631 and S. 835), sought to address this issue legislatively. The Pro Codes Act would have explicitly provided that otherwise copyrightable incorporated by reference standards retain their copyright protection even after a government incorporates them into law. At the same time, the bill would have required that standards organizations make IBR standards publicly accessible online in a readable format at no monetary cost to users. The bill failed to garner the required 250 votes with 248 votes for and 127 votes against.

== See also ==
- Building officials
