= Crown gear =

Gear whose teeth project at right angles

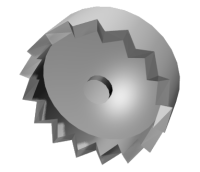
Crown gear

A crown gear (also known as a face gear or a contrate gear) is a gear which has teeth that project at right angles to the face of the wheel. In particular, a crown gear is a type of bevel gear where the pitch cone angle is 90 degrees. A pitch cone of any other angle is simply called a bevel gear. Crown gears normally mesh with other bevel gears, or sometimes spur gears, a typical use being a crown gear and pinion system which allows a rotary motion to be shifted 90 degrees.

== See also ==
- Crown circle
- Bevel gear
  - Spiral bevel gear
