= Profile angle =

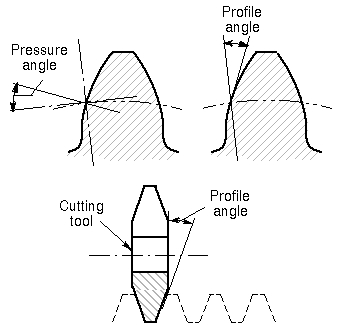
Profile angles

The profile angle of a gear is the angle at a specified pitch point between a line tangent to a tooth surface and the line normal to the pitch surface (which is a radial line of a pitch circle). This definition is applicable to every type of gear for which a pitch surface can be defined. The profile angle gives the direction of the tangent to a tooth profile.

In spur gears and straight bevel gears, tooth profiles are considered only in a transverse plane, and the general terms profile angle and pressure angle are customarily used rather than transverse profile angle and transverse pressure angle. In helical teeth, the profiles may be considered in different planes, and in specifications it is essential to use terms that indicate the direction of the plane in which the profile angle or the pressure angle lies, such as transverse profile angle, normal pressure angle, axial profile angle.

== Types ==
=== Standard ===
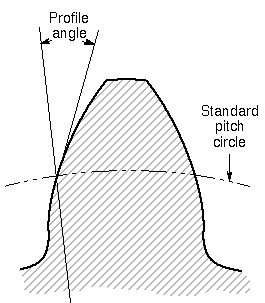
Standard profile angle

In tools for cutting, grinding, and gaging gear teeth, the profile angle is the angle between a cutting edge or a cutting surface, and some principal direction such as that of a shank, an axis, or a plane of rotation.

Standard profile angles are established in connection with standard proportions of gear teeth and standard gear cutting tools. Involute gears operate together correctly after a change of center distance, and gears designed for a different center distance can be generated correctly by standard tools. A change of center distance is accomplished by changes in operating values for pitch diameter, circular pitch, diametral pitch, pressure angle, and tooth thicknesses or backlash. The same involute gear may be used under conditions that change its operating pitch diameter and pressure angle. Unless there is a good reason for doing otherwise, it is practical to consider that the pitch and the profile angle of a single gear correspond to the pitch and the profile angle of the hob or cutter used to generate its teeth.

=== Transverse ===
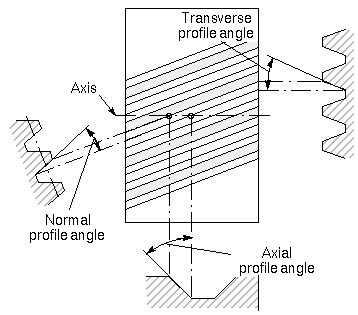
Transverse, normal, and axial profile angles

The transverse pressure angle and transverse profile angle are the pressure angle and the profile angle in a transverse plane.

=== Normal ===
Normal pressure angle and normal profile angle are the pressure and profile angles in a normal plane of a helical or a spiral tooth. In a spiral bevel gear, unless otherwise specified, profile angle means normal profile angle at the mean cone distance.

=== Axial ===
Axial pressure angle and axial profile angle are the pressure angle and the profile angle in an axial plane of a helical gear or a worm, or of a spiral bevel gear.

== See also ==
- List of gear nomenclature
