= George B. Grant =

American mechanical engineer, inventor, entrepreneur and botanist (1849–1917)

George Barnard Grant (December 21, 1849 – August 16, 1917) was an American mechanical engineer, inventor, entrepreneur and botanist. He is notable for having made important contributions to 19th-century mechanical calculators, for pioneering new techniques in gear making, and for starting several successful companies. Grant came to be known as "the Father of the American Gear Cutting Industry". Several of his businesses continued to operate many years after his death.

== Personal life ==
Grant was born in Gardiner, Maine, to Peter Grant, a farmer, and Vesta (Capen) Grant. Both his parents were descended from families that originally came to New England in the 1630s. He prepared for college at Bridgton Academy and then started at the Chandler Scientific School at Dartmouth College, where he studied for three terms. In 1869 Grant transferred to the Lawrence Scientific School at Harvard University, graduating with a B.S. degree in 1873.

After graduation from Harvard, Grant lived in Boston and Maplewood, Massachusetts. He moved to Lexington, Massachusetts, in 1887, and then Pasadena, California, around 1900. He died in Pasadena in 1917, having never married.

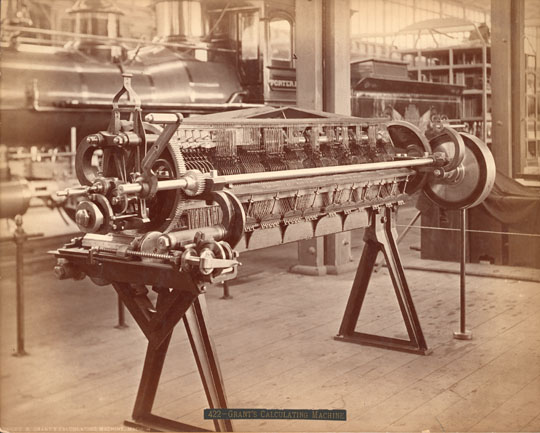
Grant 1876 Calculating Machine

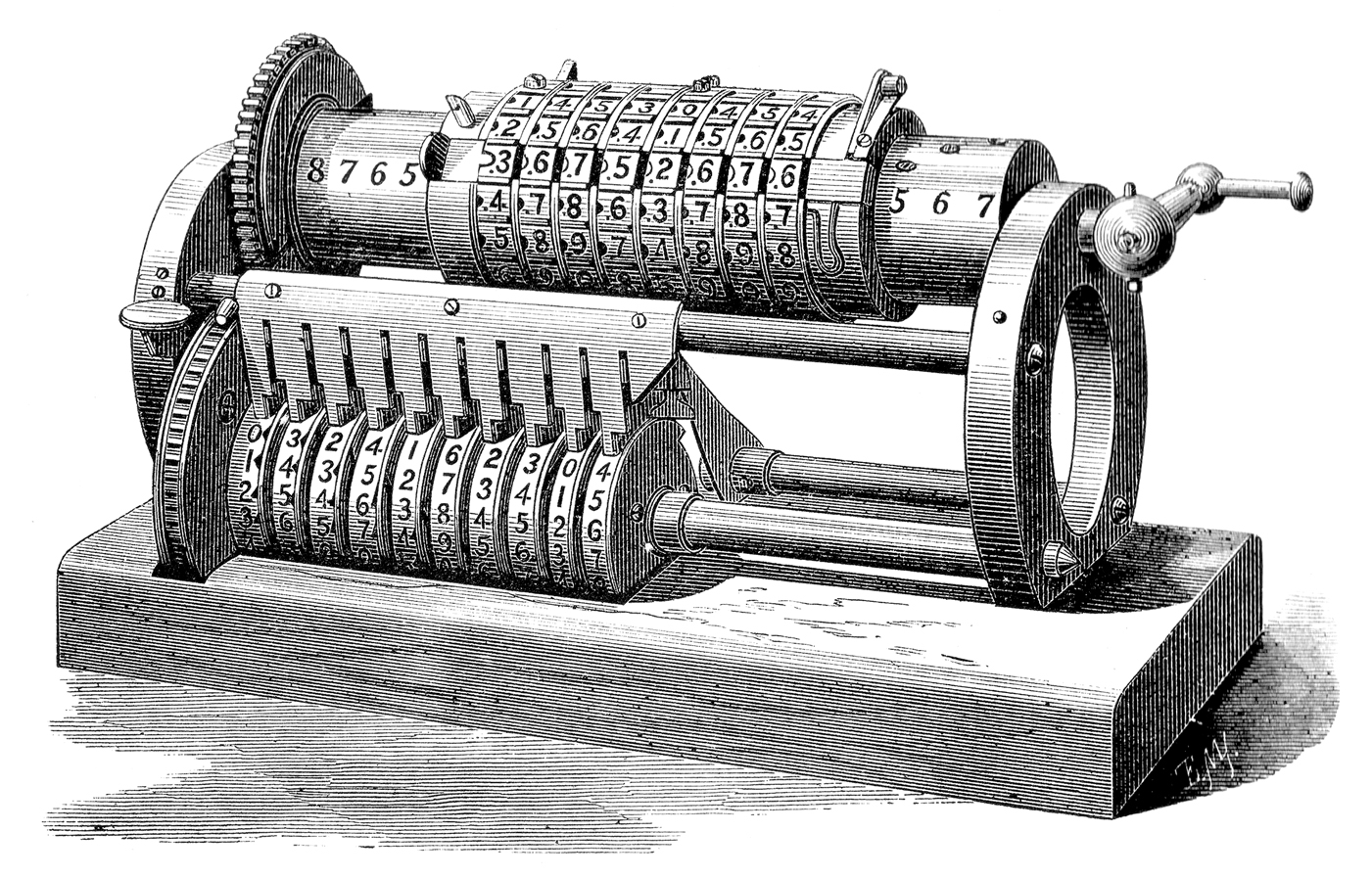
Grant's Barrel, 1877

== Calculating machine work ==
While a student at Harvard, Grant worked on the problem of inventing a mechanical calculator. With the encouragement of his professor, Oliver Wolcott Gibbs, he set about improving on the work of Babbage and Per Georg Scheutz. He published this work in the American Journal of Science and Arts (see below) and was awarded two patents as a student. Shortly after college, Grant designed and built two calculating machines that were displayed at the Centennial Exposition held in Philadelphia in 1876. One of them, known as a difference engine, was eight feet long and five feet high, and weighed 2,000 pounds. It may have been the largest calculator ever built (pictured below). The other, known as the "Centennial Model", is among the Smithsonian collection of Grant's inventions. The Smithsonian Institution has nine of Grant's inventions in its collection in Washington, D.C. Grant's calculating machine business was known as "Grant Calculating Machine Company of Lexington, Mass". Although Grant's sales of calculating machines were modest (125 of the "Rack and Pinion Model" were sold commercially), his machines were considered sturdy and reliable. Grant's calculators won a number of awards: the Centennial Medal, the Scott Medal of The Franklin Institute, and the Gold Medal of the Massachusetts Mechanics Association.

== Gear industry work ==
Through his work on calculating machines, Grant became interested in the production of gears. This field was undergoing much growth and change in the late 19th century. Grant played a leading role in that development. For example, a controversy had raged for many years over gears' optimal design. In Grant's time, the most common were cycloidal gears. Grant argued that in fact involute gears were superior for most applications. Grant played an important role in shifting industry convention, and since then most gears produced have been involute. As with calculating machines, Grant published his work in journals, and was awarded patents for his inventions of new gear manufacturing devices (see below). Grant also published books that became standard reference works in the gear industry (see below). Companies that Grant started included Grant Gear Works (1877), Boston Gear Works, Lexington Gear Works, Cleveland Gear Works, and Philadelphia Gear Works (1892). The Philadelphia Gear website has a corporate history that explains Grant's significance to the company.

== Contributions to botany ==
In California, starting in about 1900, Grant became a collector of previously undocumented plant species. He named a number of plants, and his collection is now part of the Stanford University herbarium.

== Publications ==
- Grant, George B. (June 5, 1871). "On a New Difference Engine". American Journal of Science and Arts. 2 (8): 113–117. Bibcode:1871AmJS....2..113G. doi:10.2475/ajs.s3-2.8.113. S2CID 131553703.
- Grant, George B. (July 15, 1874). "A New Calculating Machine". American Journal of Science and Arts. 8 (46): 277–284. Bibcode:1874AmJS....8..277G. doi:10.2475/ajs.s3-8.46.277. S2CID 131309896.
- Grant, George B. (1885). A Handbook on the Teeth of Gears. Lexington Gear Works.
- Grant, George B. (1891). Odontics: Or, The Theory and Practice of the Teeth of Gears. Lexington, MA: Lexington Gear Works.
- Grant, George B. (1899). A Treatise on Gear Wheels. Philadelphia Gear Works.

== Patents ==
- U.S. patent 129,335, "Improvement in Calculating-Machines", 1872
- U.S. patent 138,245, "Improvement in Calculating-Machines", 1873
- U.S. patent 368,528 "Calculating-Machine" from 1887
- U.S. patent 405,030 "Machine for Cutting Spur and Worm Gears", 1889
- U.S. patent 407,437 "Machine for Planing Gear Teeth", 1889
- U.S. patent 512,189 "Machine for Generating Beveled Gear-Teeth", 1894
- U.S. patent 605,288 "Calculating-Machine", 1898
