= AGMA =

Agma is a name for the velar nasal speech sound and the letter ⟨ŋ⟩ that stands for it.

AGMA may refer to:

- Alliance for Gray Market and Counterfeit Abatement, an anti-counterfeiting and gray market organization
- American Gear Manufacturers Association, a trade group for companies involved in gears, couplings and related power transmission components and equipment
- American Guild of Musical Artists, an entertainment labor union
- Association of Greater Manchester Authorities, the local government association for Greater Manchester, England
