= Mechanization =

Process of changing from working by hand or with animals to work with machinery

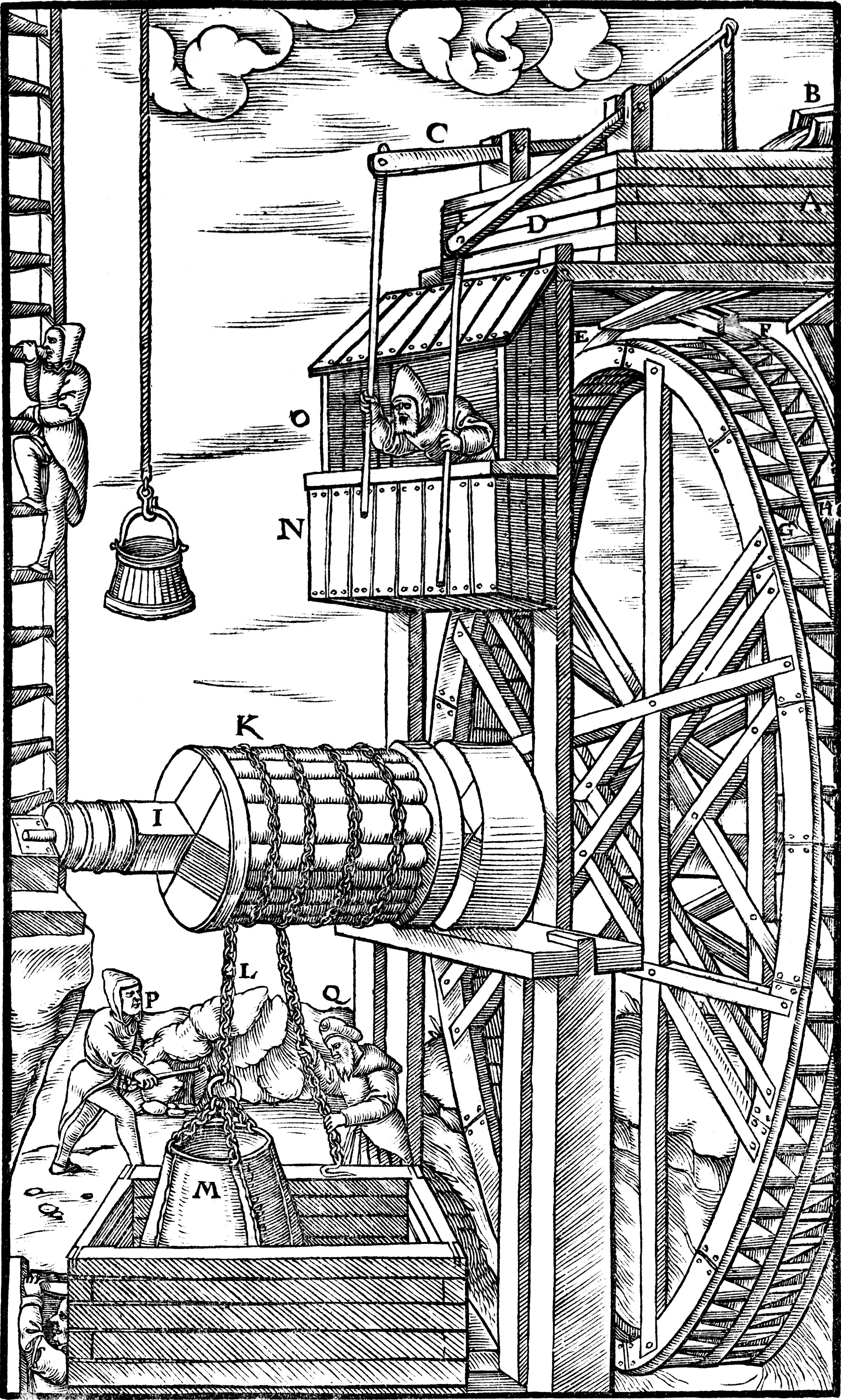
A water-powered mine hoist used for raising ore. This woodblock is from De re metallica by George Bauer (pen name Georgius Agricola, ca. 1555) an early mining textbook that contains numerous drawings and descriptions of mining equipment.

Mechanization (or mechanisation) is the process of changing from working largely or exclusively by hand or with animals to doing that work with machinery. In an early engineering text, a machine is defined as follows:

Every machine is constructed for the purpose of performing certain mechanical operations, each of which supposes the existence of two other things besides the machine in question, namely, a moving power, and an object subject to the operation, which may be termed the work to be done. Machines, in fact, are interposed between the power and the work, for the purpose of adapting the one to the other.

In every field, mechanization includes the use of hand tools. In modern usage, such as in engineering or economics, mechanization implies machinery more complex than hand tools and would not include simple devices such as an ungeared horse or donkey mill. Devices that cause speed changes or changes to or from reciprocating to rotary motion, using means such as gears, pulleys or sheaves and belts, shafts, cams and cranks, usually are considered machines. After electrification, when most small machinery was no longer hand powered, mechanization was synonymous with motorized machines. Extension of mechanization of the production process is termed as automation and it is controlled by a closed loop system in which feedback is provided by the sensors. In an automated machine the work of different mechanisms is performed automatically.

== History ==
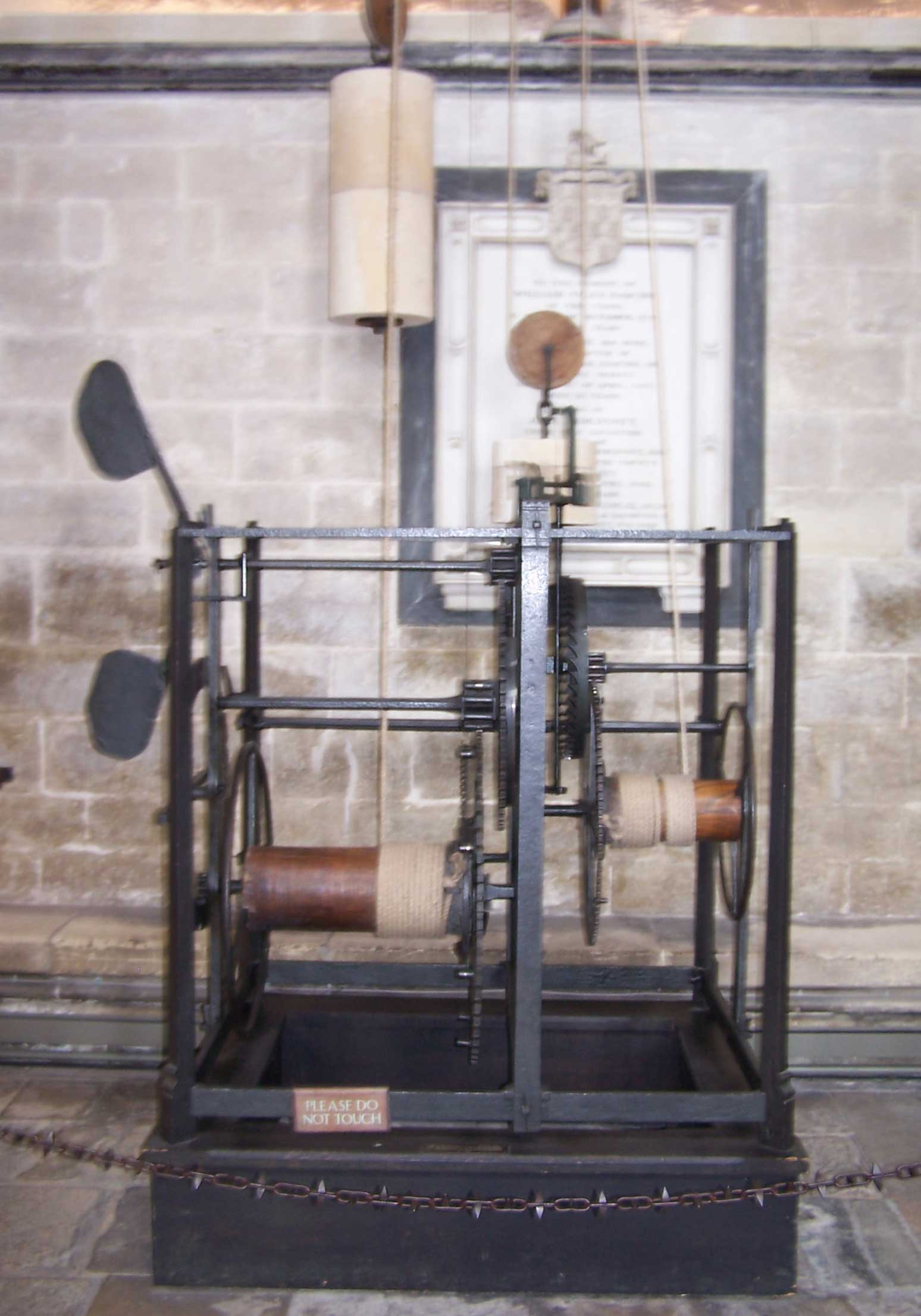
The Salisbury Cathedral clock ca. 1386. A clock is a mechanical instrument rather than a true machine. Although this clock had iron gears, many machines of the early Industrial Revolution used wooden parts until around 1800.

=== Ancient times ===
Water wheels date to the Roman period and were used to grind grain and lift irrigation water. Water-powered bellows were in use on blast furnaces in China in 31 AD. By the 13th century, water wheels powered sawmills and trip hammers, to pull cloth and pound flax and later cotton rags into pulp for making paper. Trip hammers are shown crushing ore in De re Metallica (1555).

Clocks were some of the most complex early mechanical devices. Clock makers were important developers of machine tools including gear and screw cutting machines, and were also involved in the mathematical development of gear designs. Clocks were some of the earliest mass-produced items, beginning around 1830.

Water-powered bellows for blast furnaces, used in China in ancient times, were in use in Europe by the 15th century. De re Metallica contains drawings related to bellows for blast furnaces including a fabrication drawing.

Improved gear designs decreased wear and increased efficiency. Mathematical gear designs were developed in the mid 17th century. French mathematician and engineer Desargues designed and constructed the first mill with epicycloidal teeth ca. 1650. In the 18th century involute gears, another mathematical derived design, came into use. Involute gears are better for meshing gears of different sizes than epicycloidal. Gear cutting machines came into use in the 18th century.

=== Industrial revolution ===
The Newcomen steam engine was first used, to pump water from a mine, in 1712. John Smeaton introduced metal gears and axles to water wheels in the mid to last half of the 18th century. The Industrial Revolution started mainly with textile machinery, such as the spinning jenny (1764) and water frame (1768).

Demand for metal parts used in textile machinery led to the invention of many machine tools in the late 1700s until the mid-1800s. After the early decades of the 19th century, iron increasingly replaced wood in gearing and shafts in textile machinery. In the 1840s self acting machine tools were developed. Machinery was developed to make nails ca. 1810. The Fourdrinier paper machine for continuous production of paper was patented in 1801, displacing the centuries-old hand method of making individual sheets of paper.

One of the first mechanical devices used in agriculture was the seed drill invented by Jethro Tull around 1700. The seed drill allowed more uniform spacing of seed and planting depth than hand methods, increasing yields and saving valuable seed. In 1817, the first bicycle was invented and used in Germany. Mechanized agriculture greatly increased in the late eighteenth and early nineteenth centuries with horse drawn reapers and horse powered threshing machines. By the late nineteenth century steam power was applied to threshing and steam tractors appeared. Internal combustion began being used for tractors in the early twentieth century. Threshing and harvesting was originally done with attachments for tractors, but in the 1930s independently powered combine harvesters were in use.

In the mid to late 19th century, hydraulic and pneumatic devices were able to power various mechanical actions, such as positioning tools or work pieces. Pile drivers and steam hammers are examples for heavy work. In food processing, pneumatic or hydraulic devices could start and stop filling of cans or bottles on a conveyor. Power steering for automobiles uses hydraulic mechanisms, as does practically all earth moving equipment and other construction equipment and many attachments to tractors. Pneumatic (usually compressed air) power is widely used to operate industrial valves.

=== Twentieth century ===
By the early 20th century machines developed the ability to perform more complex operations that had previously been done by skilled craftsmen. An example is the glass bottle making machine developed 1905. It replaced highly paid glass blowers and child labor helpers and led to the mass production of glass bottles.

After 1900 factories were electrified, and electric motors and controls were used to perform more complicated mechanical operations. This resulted in mechanized processes to manufacture almost all goods.

=== Categories ===
Two involute gears, the left driving the right: Blue arrows show the contact forces between them. The force line (or line of action) runs along a tangent common to both base circles. (In this situation, there is no force, and no contact needed, along the opposite common tangent not shown.) The involutes here are traced out in converse fashion: points (of contact) move along the stationary force-vector "string" as if it was being unwound from the left rotating base circle, and wound onto the right rotating base circle.

In manufacturing, mechanization replaced hand methods of making goods. Prime movers are devices that convert thermal, potential or kinetic energy into mechanical work. Prime movers include internal combustion engines, combustion turbines (jet engines), water wheels and turbines, windmills and wind turbines and steam engines and turbines. Powered transportation equipment such as locomotives, automobiles and trucks and airplanes, is a classification of machinery which includes sub classes by engine type, such as internal combustion, combustion turbine and steam. Inside factories, warehouses, lumber yards and other manufacturing and distribution operations, material handling equipment replaced manual carrying or hand trucks and carts.

In mining and excavation, power shovels replaced picks and shovels. Rock and ore crushing had been done for centuries by water-powered trip hammers, but trip hammers have been replaced by modern ore crushers and ball mills.

Bulk material handling systems and equipment are used for a variety of materials including coal, ores, grains, sand, gravel and wood products.

Construction equipment includes cranes, concrete mixers, concrete pumps, cherry pickers and an assortment of power tools.

=== Powered machinery ===
Powered machinery today usually means either by electric motor or internal combustion engine. Before the first decade of the 20th century, "powered" usually meant by steam engine, water or wind.

Many of the early machines and machine tools were hand powered, but most changed over to water or steam power by the early 19th century.

Before electrification, mill and factory power was usually transmitted using a line shaft. Electrification allowed individual machines to each be powered by a separate motor in what is called unit drive. Unit drive allowed factories to be better arranged and allowed different machines to run at different speeds. Unit drive also allowed much higher speeds, which was especially important for machine tools.

A step beyond mechanization is automation. Early production machinery, such as the glass bottle blowing machine (ca. 1890s), required a lot of operator involvement. By the 1920s fully automatic machines, which required much less operator attention, were being used.

=== Military usage ===
The term is also used in the military to refer to the use of tracked armoured vehicles, particularly armoured personnel carriers, to move troops ( mechanized infantry) that would otherwise have marched or ridden trucks into combat. In military terminology, mechanized refers to ground units that can fight from vehicles, while motorized refers to units (motorized infantry) that are transported and go to battle in unarmoured vehicles such as trucks. Thus, a towed artillery unit is considered motorized while a self-propelled one is mechanized.

== Mechanical vs human labour ==
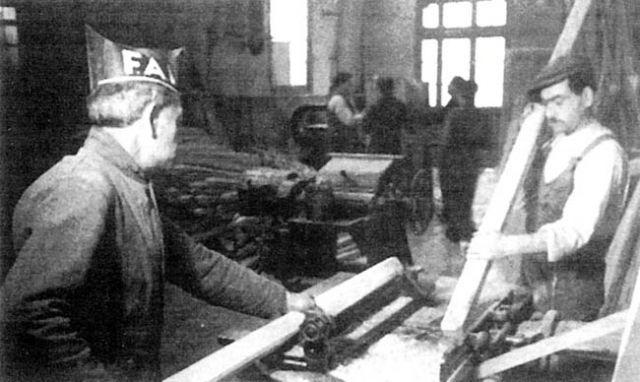
CNT-FAI worker cooperative in Barcelona producing wood and steel products

Comparing the efficiency of a labourer, it often has an efficiency of about 1%–5.5% (depending on whether he uses arms, or a combination of arms and legs). Internal combustion engines mostly have an efficiency of about 20%, although large diesel engines, such as those used to power ships, may have efficiencies of nearly 50%. Industrial electric motors have efficiencies up to the low 90% range, before correcting for the conversion efficiency of fuel to electricity of about 35%.

When we compare the costs of using an internal combustion engine to a worker to perform work, we notice that an engine can perform more work at a comparative cost. 1 liter of fossil fuel burnt with an IC engine equals about 50 hands of workers operating for 24 hours or 275 arms and legs for 24 hours.

In addition, the combined work capability of a human is also much lower than that of a machine. An average human worker can provide work for around 0,9 hp (2.3 MJ per hour) while a machine (depending on the type and size) can provide far greater amounts of work. For example, it takes more than one and a half hour of hard labour to deliver only one kWh – which a small engine could deliver in less than one hour while burning less than one litre of petroleum fuel. This implies that a gang of 20 to 40 men will require a financial compensation for their work at least equal to the required expended food calories (which is at least 4 to 20 times higher). In most situations, the worker will also want compensation for the lost time, which is easily 96 times greater per day. Even if we assume the real wage cost for the human labour to be at US $1.00/day, an energy cost is generated of about $4.00/kWh. Despite this being a low wage for hard labour, even in some of the countries with the lowest wages, it represents an energy cost that is significantly more expensive than even exotic power sources such as solar photovoltaic panels (and thus even more expensive when compared to wind energy harvesters or luminescent solar concentrators).

== Levels of mechanization ==
For simplification, one can study mechanization as a series of steps. Many students refer to this series as indicating basic-to-advanced forms of mechanical society.

1. hand/muscle power
2. hand-tools
3. powered hand-tools, e.g. electric-controlled
4. powered tools, single functioned, fixed cycle
5. powered tools, multi-functioned, program controlled
6. powered tools, remote-controlled
7. powered tools, activated by work-piece (e.g.: coin phone)
8. measurement
9. selected signaling control, e.g. hydro power control
10. performance recording
11. automated machine action altered through measurement
12. segregation/rejection according to measurement
13. selection of appropriate action cycle
14. correcting performance after operation
15. correcting performance during operation

== See also ==
- Assembly line
- Bulk materials handling
- Industrialisation
- Newly industrialized country
