= Crowned teeth =

Crowned teeth may refer to:

- List of gear nomenclature#Crowned teeth - a term used in gear nomenclature
- Crown (dentistry) - a type of dental restoration
