= Inside cylinder =

Inside cylinder can mean:

- One of the dimensions of a gearwheel, see List of gear nomenclature#Inside cylinder
- A steam locomotive cylinder positioned in the middle of the frame, see Cylinder (locomotive)#Inside or outside cylinders
