= Base circle =

Base circle may refer to:

- Base circle (mechanics), a circular line in gear wheels
- Base circle (mathematics), a historical synonym for unit circle in mathematics
