= Outside cylinder =

Outside cylinder can mean:

- One of the dimensions of a gearwheel, see List of gear nomenclature#Outside cylinder
- A steam locomotive cylinder positioned outside the frame, see Cylinder (locomotive)#Inside or outside cylinders
