= Principal direction =

A principal direction can refer to one of the following:

- Principal directions (geometry) - In differential geometry, one of the directions of principal curvature.
- Principal directions - a term used in gear nomenclature.
- In stress analysis, a set of axes where the normal stress vector is maximized. See Stress (mechanics)
