= Spur gear =

Simplest type of gear

Spur gear

Spur gears or straight-cut gears are the simplest type of gear. They consist of a cylinder or disk with teeth projecting radially. Viewing the gear at 90 degrees from the shaft length (side on) the tooth faces are straight and aligned parallel to the axis of rotation. Looking down the length of the shaft, a tooth's cross section is usually not triangular. The sides of the cross section have a curved form (usually involute and less commonly cycloidal) to achieve a constant drive ratio. Spur gears mesh correctly only if fitted to parallel shafts. No axial thrust is created by the tooth loads. Spur gears are excellent at moderate speeds but noisy at high speeds.

Spur gears are classified according to their pressure angle, with 20° and 25° being the common in modern equipment and 14.5° often being found in older equipment.

Spur gear teeth are manufactured with either an involute or cycloidal profile. When two gears mesh, it is possible that an involute portion of one contacts a non-involute portion of the other. This phenomenon is known as "interference" and occurs when the number of teeth on the smaller of the two meshing gears is less than a required minimum. Undercutting (cutting the tooth narrower closer to its base) is sometimes used to avoid interference, but is usually not suitable because the decreased thickness leaves the tooth weaker at its base. In this situation, corrected gears are used. In corrected gears the cutter rack is shifted upwards or downwards.

Spur gears can be classified as either external or internal. External gears have teeth on the outside of the cylinder. Internal gears have teeth on the internal side of the cylinder. An external gear can mesh with an external gear or an internal gear. Internal gears can mesh only with external gears. When two external gears mesh together they rotate in opposite directions. An internal gear rotates in the same direction as its paired external gear. Due to the close positioning of shafts, internal gear assemblies are more compact.

== PCD and MOD ==
In the case of Module (MOD) 4.0 spur gears:

- Normal spur gears (over 17 teeth) have a pitch circle diameter (PCD) equal to MOD × number of teeth.
- Corrected spur gears (under 17 teeth) have a PCD equal to MOD × number of teeth + MOD.

The two types of corrected gears are:

- S0 gearing (x1 + x2 = zero)
- S gearing (x1 + x2 ≠ zero)
