= Gear train =

Mechanical transmission using multiple gears

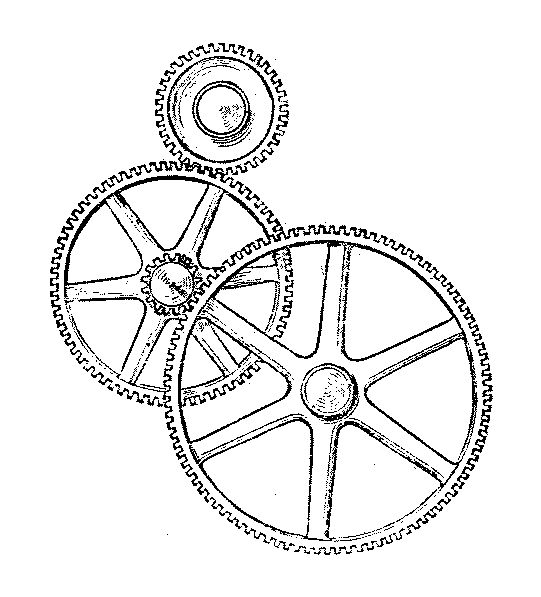
Transmission of motion and force by gear wheels, compound train

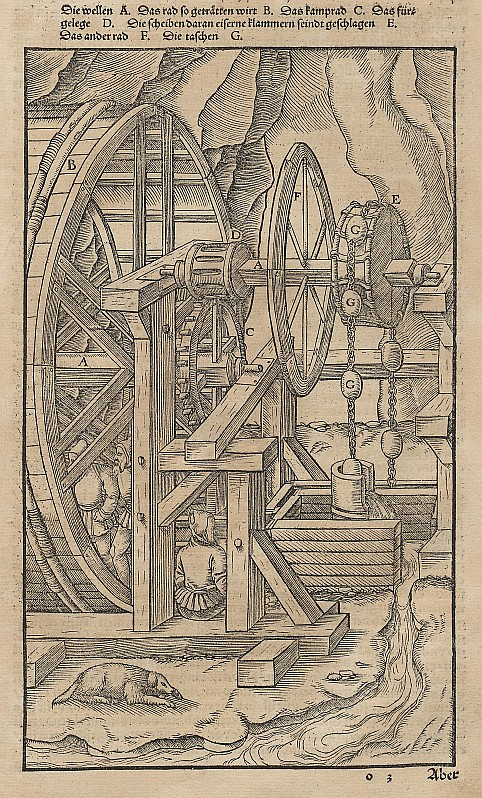
Illustration by Georgius Agricola (1580) showing a toothed wheel that engages a slotted cylinder to form a gear train that transmits power from a human-powered treadmill to mining pump

A gear train or gear set is a machine element of a mechanical system formed by mounting two or more gears on a frame such that the teeth of the gears engage.

Gear teeth are designed to ensure the pitch circles of engaging gears roll on each other without slipping, providing a smooth transmission of rotation from one gear to the next. Features of gears and gear trains include:

- The gear ratio of the pitch circles of mating gears defines the speed ratio and the mechanical advantage of the gear set.
- A planetary gear train provides high gear reduction in a compact package.
- It is possible to design gear teeth for gears that are non-circular, yet still transmit torque smoothly.
- The speed ratios of chain and belt drives are computed in the same way as gear ratios. See bicycle gearing.

The transmission of rotation between contacting toothed wheels can be traced back to the Antikythera mechanism of Greece and the south-pointing chariot of China. Illustrations by the Renaissance scientist Georgius Agricola show gear trains with cylindrical teeth. The implementation of the involute tooth yielded a standard gear design that provides a constant speed ratio.

== Gear ratio ==
Two meshed spur gears showing tangent contact between their pitch circles, each illustrated with broken blue lines; the gear on the left has 10 teeth and the gear on the right has 15 teeth.

=== Dimensions and terms ===
The pitch circle of a given gear is determined by the tangent point contact between two meshing gears; for example, two spur gears mesh together when their pitch circles are tangent, as illustrated.

The pitch diameter d is the diameter of a gear's pitch circle, measured through that gear's rotational centerline, and the pitch radius r is the radius of the pitch circle. The distance between the rotational centerlines of two meshing gears is equal to the sum of their respective pitch radii.

The circular pitch p is the distance, measured along the pitch circle, between one tooth and the corresponding point on an adjacent tooth.

The number of teeth N per gear is an integer determined by the pitch circle and circular pitch.

=== Relationships ===
Spur gear tooth dimensions and how they are measured: t = tooth thickness, along the pitch circle; p = circular pitch, along the pitch circle; a = addendum, radially; b = dedendum, radially; In this example, the gear has 20 teeth.

The circular pitch p of a gear can be defined as the circumference of the pitch circle using its pitch radius r divided by the number of teeth N:

$$p \equiv \frac{2\pi r}{N}$$

The thickness t of each tooth, measured through the pitch circle, is equal to the gap between neighboring teeth (also measured through the pitch circle) to ensure the teeth on adjacent gears, cut to the same tooth profile, can mesh without interference. This means the circular pitch p is equal to twice the thickness of a tooth,

$$p=2t$$

In the United States, the diametral pitch P is the number of teeth on a gear divided by the pitch diameter; for SI countries, the module m is the reciprocal of this value. For any gear, the relationship between the number of teeth, diametral pitch or module, and pitch diameter is given by:

$$d = \frac{N}{P} = N \cdot m$$

Since the pitch diameter is related to circular pitch as

$$d \equiv 2r = \frac{Np}{\pi}$$

this means

$$\frac{N}{P} = N \cdot m = \frac{Np}{\pi}$$

Rearranging, we obtain a relationship between diametral pitch and circular pitch:

$$P = \frac{1}{m} = \frac{\pi}{p}$$

=== Gear or speed ratio ===
Two meshing gears transmit rotational motion; note difference in rotational speeds is equal to the reciprocal of the ratio between the number of teeth on the two gears

For a pair of meshing gears, the angular speed ratio, also known as the gear ratio, can be computed from the ratio of the pitch radii or the ratio of the number of teeth on each gear. Define the angular speed ratio R_{AB} of two meshed gears A and B as the ratio of the magnitude of their respective angular velocities:

$$R_{AB} \equiv \frac{|\omega_A|}{|\omega_B|}$$

Here, subscripts are used to designate the gear, so gear A has a radius of r_{A} and angular velocity of ω_{A} with N_{A} teeth, which meshes with gear B which has corresponding values for radius r_{B}, angular velocity ω_{B}, and N_{B} teeth.

When these two gears are meshed and turn without slipping, the velocity v of the tangent point where the two pitch circles come in contact is the same on both gears, and is given by:

$$v = | r_A \omega_A | = | r_B \omega_B |$$

Rearranging, the ratio of angular velocity magnitudes is the inverse of the ratio of pitch circle radii:

$$\frac{|\omega_A|}{|\omega_B|} = \frac{r_B}{r_A}$$

Therefore, the angular speed ratio can be determined from the respective pitch radii:

$$R_{AB} \equiv \left| \frac{\omega_A}{\omega_B} \right| = \frac{r_B}{r_A}$$

For example, if gear A has a pitch circle radius of 1 in (25 mm) and gear B has a pitch circle radius of 2 in (51 mm), the angular speed ratio R_{AB} is 2, which is sometimes written as 2:1. Gear A turns at twice the speed of gear B. For every complete revolution of gear A (360°), gear B makes half a revolution (180°).

In addition, consider that in order to mesh smoothly and turn without slipping, these two gears A and B must have compatible teeth. Given the same tooth and gap widths, they also must have the same circular pitch p, which means

$p_A = p_B$ or, equivalently $\frac{2\pi r_A}{N_A} = \frac{2\pi r_B}{N_B}$

This equation can be rearranged to show the ratio of the pitch circle radii of two meshing gears is equal to the ratio of their number of teeth:

$$\frac{r_B}{r_A} = \frac{N_B}{N_A}$$

Since the angular speed ratio R_{AB} depends on the ratio of pitch circle radii, it is equivalently determined by the ratio of the number of teeth:

$$R_{AB} \equiv \frac{|\omega_A|}{|\omega_B|} = \frac{r_B}{r_A} = \frac{N_B}{N_A}$$

In other words, the [angular] speed ratio is inversely proportional to the radius of the pitch circle and the number of teeth of gear A, and directly proportional to the same values for gear B.

=== Torque ratio analysis using virtual work ===
The gear ratio also determines the transmitted torque. The torque ratio TR_{AB} of the gear train is defined as the ratio of its output torque to its input torque. Using the principle of virtual work, the gear train's torque ratio is equal to the gear ratio, or speed ratio, of the gear train. Again, assume we have two gears A and B, with subscripts designating each gear and gear A serving as the input gear.

$${\mathrm{TR}}_{AB} \equiv \frac{T_B}{T_A}$$

For this analysis, consider a gear train that has one degree of freedom, which means the angular rotation of all the gears in the gear train are defined by the angle of the input gear. The input torque T_{A} acting on the input gear A is transformed by the gear train into the output torque T_{B} exerted by the output gear B.

Let R_{AB} be the speed ratio, then by definition

$$R_{AB} \equiv \frac{|\omega_A|}{|\omega_B|}$$

Assuming the gears are rigid and there are no losses in the engagement of the gear teeth, then the principle of virtual work can be used to analyze the static equilibrium of the gear train. Because there is a single degree of freedom, the angle θ of the input gear completely determines the angle of the output gear and serves as the generalized coordinate of the gear train.

$$\frac{d\theta}{dt} = \omega_A$$

The speed ratio R_{AB} of the gear train can be rearranged to give the magnitude of angular velocity of the output gear in terms of the input gear velocity.

$$|\omega_B| = \frac{|\omega_A|}{R_{AB}}$$

Rewriting in terms of a common angular velocity,

$$\omega_A = \omega, \quad \omega_B = \frac{\omega}{R_{AB}}\!$$

The principle of virtual work states the input force on gear A and the output force on gear B using applied torques will sum to zero:

$$F_\theta =  T_A  \frac{\partial\omega_A}{\partial\omega} - T_B \frac{\partial \omega_B}{\partial\omega}= T_A - \frac{T_B}{R_{AB}} = 0.$$

This can be rearranged to:

$$R_{AB} = \frac{T_B}{T_A}$$

Since R_{AB} is the gear ratio of the gear train, the input torque T_{A} applied to the input gear A and the output torque T_{B} on the output gear B are related by the same gear or speed ratio.

=== Mechanical advantage ===
The torque ratio of a gear train is also known as its mechanical advantage; as demonstrated, the gear ratio and speed ratio of a gear train also give its mechanical advantage.

$$\mathrm{MA} \equiv \frac{T_B}{T_A} = R_{AB}$$

The mechanical advantage MA of a pair of meshing gears for which the input gear A has N_{A} teeth and the output gear B has N_{B} teeth is given by

$$\mathrm{MA} = R_{AB} = \left| \frac{\omega_A}{\omega_B} \right| = \frac{N_B}{N_A}$$

This shows that if the output gear B has more teeth than the input gear A, then the gear train amplifies the input torque. In this case, the gear train is called a speed reducer and since the output gear must have more teeth than the input gear, the speed reducer amplifies the input torque. When the input gear rotates faster than the output gear, then the gear train amplifies the input torque. Conversely, if the output gear has fewer teeth than the input gear, then the gear train reduces the input torque; in other words, when the input gear rotates slower than the output gear, the gear train reduces the input torque.

=== Hunting and non-hunting gear sets ===
A hunting gear set is a set of gears where the gear teeth counts are relatively prime on each gear in an interfacing pair. Since the number of teeth on each gear have no common factors, then any tooth on one of the gears will come into contact with every tooth on the other gear before encountering the same tooth again. This results in less wear and longer life of the mechanical parts. A non-hunting gear set is one where the teeth counts are insufficiently prime. In this case, some particular gear teeth will come into contact with particular opposing gear teeth more times than others, resulting in more wear on some teeth than others.

== Implementations ==
=== Gear trains with two gears ===
Two meshed spur gears, with a 2:1 ratio

The simplest example of a gear train has two gears. The input gear (also known as the drive gear or driver) transmits power to the output gear (also known as the driven gear). The input gear will typically be connected to a power source, such as a motor or engine. In such an example, the output of torque and rotational speed from the output (driven) gear depend on the ratio of the dimensions of the two gears or the ratio of the tooth counts.

=== Idler gears ===
Gear train with an idler gear in the middle which does not affect the overall gear ratio but reverses the direction of rotation of the gear on the right

In a sequence of gears chained together, the ratio depends only on the number of teeth on the first and last gear. The intermediate gears, regardless of their size, do not alter the overall gear ratio of the chain. However, the addition of each intermediate gear reverses the direction of rotation of the final gear.

An intermediate gear which does not drive a shaft to perform any work is called an idler gear. Sometimes, a single idler gear is used to reverse the direction, in which case it may be referred to as a reverse idler. For instance, the typical automobile manual transmission engages reverse gear by means of inserting a reverse idler between two gears.

Idler gears can also transmit rotation among distant shafts in situations where it would be impractical to simply make the distant gears larger to bring them together. Not only do larger gears occupy more space, the mass and rotational inertia (moment of inertia) of a gear is proportional to the square of its radius. Instead of idler gears, a toothed belt or chain can be used to transmit torque over distance.

==== Formula ====
If a simple gear train has three gears, such that the input gear A meshes with an intermediate gear I which in turn meshes with the output gear B, then the pitch circle of the intermediate gear rolls without slipping on both the pitch circles of the input and output gears. This yields the two relations

$$\frac{|\omega_A|}{|\omega_I|} = \frac{N_I}{N_A}, \quad \frac{|\omega_I|}{|\omega_B|} = \frac{N_B}{N_I}.$$

The speed ratio of the overall gear train is obtained by multiplying these two equations for each pair (A-I and I-B) to obtain

$$R = \frac{|\omega_A|}{|\omega_B|} = \frac{N_B}{N_A}.$$

This is because the number of idler gear teeth N_{I} cancels out when the gear ratios of the two subsets are multiplied:

$$\begin{align}
R_{final} &= R_{AI} \cdot R_{IB} \\
&= \left( \frac{N_I}{N_A} \right) \cdot \left( \frac{N_B}{N_I} \right) = \left( \frac{N_B}{N_A} \right)
\end{align}$$

Notice that this gear ratio is exactly the same as for the case when the gears A and B engage directly. The intermediate gear provides spacing but does not affect the gear ratio. For this reason it is called an idler gear. The same gear ratio is obtained for a sequence of idler gears and hence an idler gear is used to provide the same direction to rotate the driver and driven gear. If the driver gear moves in the clockwise direction, then the driven gear also moves in the clockwise direction with the help of the idler gear.

==== Example ====
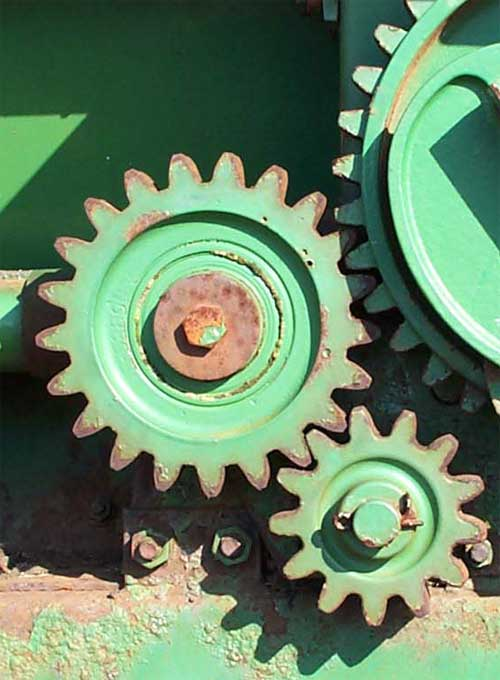
Two gears and an idler gear on a piece of farm equipment, with a ratio of 42:13 ≈ 3.23:1.

In the photo, assume the smallest gear (gear A, in the lower right corner) is connected to the motor, which makes it the drive gear or input gear. The somewhat larger gear in the middle (gear I) is called an idler gear. It is not connected directly to either the motor or the output shaft and only transmits power between the input and output gears. There is a third gear (gear B) partially shown in the upper-right corner of the photo. Assuming that gear is connected to the machine's output shaft, it is the output or driven gear.

Considering only gears A and I, the gear ratio between the idler and the input gear can be calculated as if the idler gear was the output gear. The input gear A in this two-gear subset has 13 teeth (N_{A}) and the idler gear I has 21 teeth (N_{I}). Therefore, the gear ratio for this subset R_{AI} is

$$R_{AI} = \frac{N_I}{N_A} = \frac{21}{13}$$

This is approximately 1.62 or 1.62:1. At this ratio, it means the drive gear (A) must make 1.62 revolutions to turn the output gear (I) once. It also means that for every one revolution of the driver (A), the output gear (I) has made 13/21 = 1/1.62, or 0.62, revolutions. The larger gear (I) turns slower.

The third gear in the picture (B) has N_{B} = 42 teeth. Now consider the gear ratio for the subset consisting of gears I and B, with the idler gear I serving as the input and third gear B serving as the output. The gear ratio between the idler (I) and third gear (B) R_{IB} is thus

$$R_{IB} = \frac{N_B}{N_I} = \frac{42}{21}$$

or 2:1.

The final gear ratio of the compound system is 1.62 × 2 ≈ 3.23. For every 3.23 revolutions of the smallest gear A, the largest gear B turns one revolution, or for every one revolution of the smallest gear A, the largest gear B turns 0.31 (1/3.23) revolution, a total reduction of about 1:3.23 (Gear Reduction Ratio (GRR) is the inverse of Gear Ratio (GR)).

Since the idler gear I contacts directly both the smaller gear A and the larger gear B, it can be removed from the calculation, also giving a ratio of 42/13 ≈ 3.23. The idler gear serves to make both the drive gear and the driven gear rotate in the same direction, but confers no mechanical advantage.

=== Double reduction gear ===
Double reduction gears

A double reduction gear set comprises two pairs of gears, each individually single reductions, in series. In the diagram, the red and blue gears give the first stage of reduction and the orange and green gears give the second stage of reduction. The total reduction is the product of the first stage of reduction and the second stage of reduction.

It is essential to have two coupled gears, of different sizes, on the intermediate layshaft. If a single intermediate gear was used, the overall ratio would be simply that between the first and final gears, the intermediate gear would only act as an idler gear: it would reverse the direction of rotation, but not change the ratio.

=== Belt and chain drives ===
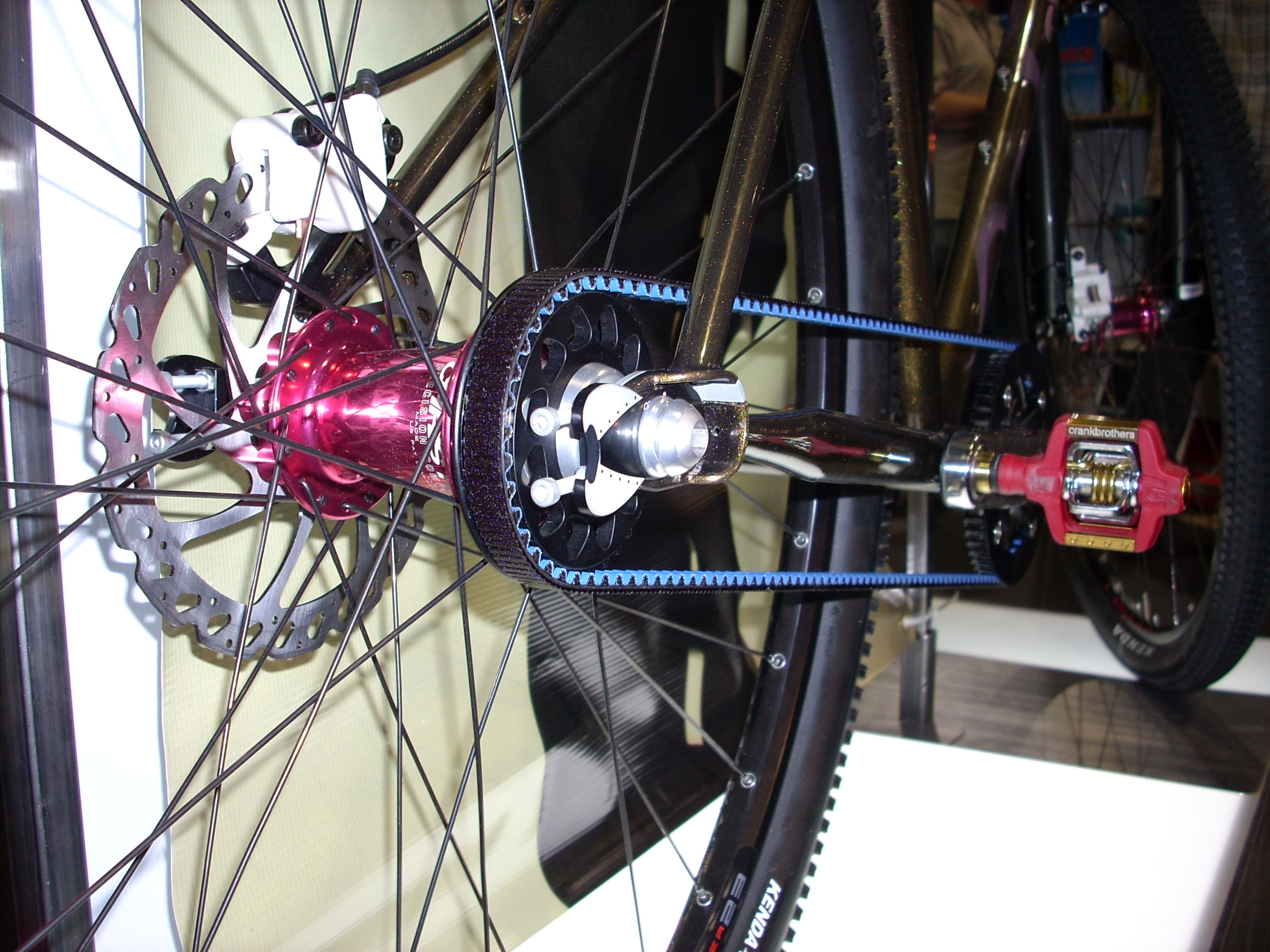
Bicycle with toothed belt drive to transmit torque from crank to rear sprocket

Special gears called sprockets can be coupled together with chains, as on bicycles and some motorcycles. Alternatively, belts can have teeth in them also and be coupled to gear-like pulleys. Again, exact accounting of teeth and revolutions can be applied with these machines.

For example, a belt with teeth, called the timing belt, is used in some internal combustion engines to synchronize the movement of the camshaft with that of the crankshaft, so that the valves open and close at the top of each cylinder at exactly the right time relative to the movement of each piston. A chain, called a timing chain, is used on some automobiles for this purpose, while in others, the camshaft and crankshaft are coupled directly together through meshed gears. Regardless of which form of drive is employed, the crankshaft-to-camshaft gear ratio is always 2:1 on four-stroke engines, which means that for every two revolutions of the crankshaft the camshaft will rotate once.

== Automotive applications ==
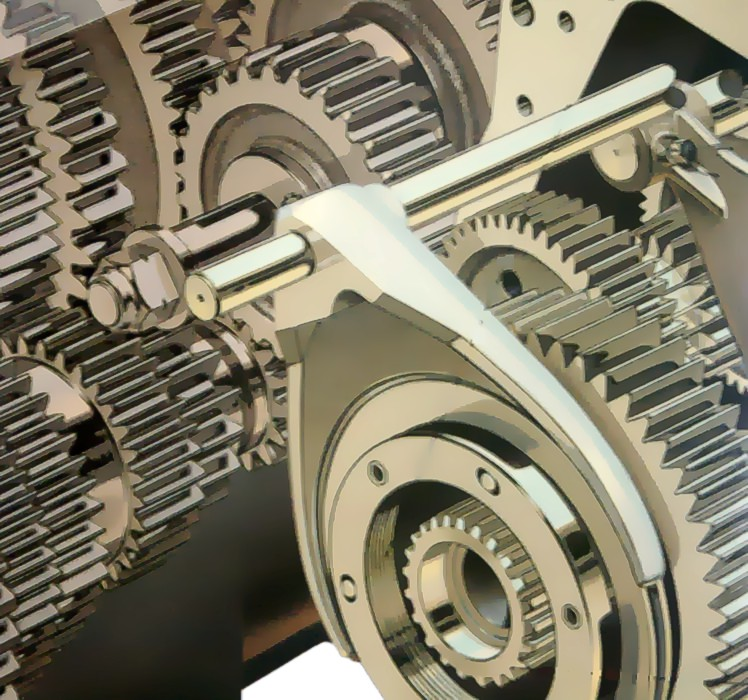
Cutaway illustration of gears of an automotive transmission

Automobile powertrains generally have two or more major areas where gear sets are used.

For internal combustion engine (ICE) vehicles, gearing is typically employed in the transmission, which contains a number of different sets of gears that can be changed to allow a wide range of vehicle speeds while operating the ICE within a narrower range of speeds, optimizing efficiency, power, and torque. Because electric vehicles instead use one or more electric traction motor(s) which generally have a broader range of operating speeds, they are typically equipped with a single-ratio reduction gear set instead.

The second common gear set in almost all motor vehicles is the differential, which contains the final drive to and often provides additional speed reduction at the wheels. Moreover, the differential contains gearing that splits torque equally between the two wheels while permitting them to have different speeds when traveling in a curved path.

The transmission and final drive might be separate and connected by a driveshaft, or they might be combined into one unit called a transaxle. The gear ratios in transmission and final drive are important because different gear ratios will change the characteristics of a vehicle's performance.

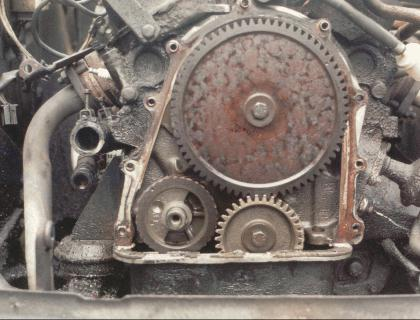
Valve timing gears on a Ford Taunus V4 engine — the small gear is on the crankshaft, the larger gear is on the camshaft. The crankshaft gear has 34 teeth, the camshaft gear has 68 teeth and runs at half the crankshaft RPM. (The small gear in the lower left is on the balance shaft.)

As noted, the ICE itself is often equipped with a gear train to synchronize valve operation with crankshaft speed. Typically, the camshafts are driven by gearing, chain, or toothed belt.

=== Example ===
2004 Chevrolet Corvette C5 Z06, six-speed manual transmission
| Gear | 1 | 2 | 3 | 4 | 5 | 6 | R |
| Ratio | 2.97:1 | 2.07:1 | 1.43:1 | 1.00:1 | 0.84:1 | 0.56:1 | −3.38:1 |

In first gear, the engine makes 2.97 revolutions for every revolution of the transmission's output. In fourth gear, the gear ratio of 1:1 means that the engine and the transmission's output rotate at the same speed, referred to as the "direct drive" ratio. Fifth and sixth gears are known as overdrive gears, in which the output of the transmission revolves faster than the engine's output.

The Corvette above is equipped with a differential that has a final drive ratio (or axle ratio) of 3.42:1, meaning that for every 3.42 revolutions of the transmission's output, the wheels make one revolution. The differential ratio multiplies with the transmission ratio, so in 1st gear, the engine makes 2.97 × 3.42 = 10.16 revolutions for every revolution of the wheels.

The car's tires can almost be thought of as a third type of gearing. This car is equipped with 295/35-18 tires, which have a circumference of 82.1 inches. This means that for every complete revolution of the wheel, the car travels 82.1 inches (209 cm). If the Corvette had larger tires, it would travel farther with each revolution of the wheel, which would be like a higher gear. If the car had smaller tires, it would be like a lower gear.

With the gear ratios of the transmission and differential and the size of the tires, it becomes possible to calculate the speed of the car for a particular gear at a particular engine RPM.

For example, it is possible to determine the distance the car will travel for one revolution of the engine by dividing the circumference of the tire by the combined gear ratio of the transmission and differential.

$$d = \frac{c_t}{gr_t \times gr_d}$$

It is also possible to determine a car's speed from the engine speed by multiplying the circumference of the tire by the engine speed and dividing by the combined gear ratio.

$$v_c = \frac{c_t \times v_e}{gr_t \times gr_d}$$

Note that the answer is in inches per minute, which can be converted to mph by dividing by 1056.

| Gear | Distance per engine revolution | Speed per 1000 RPM |
|---|---|---|
| 1st gear | 8 in (200 mm) | 7.6 mph (12.2 km/h) |
| 2nd gear | 11.5 in (290 mm) | 10.9 mph (17.5 km/h) |
| 3rd gear | 16.6 in (420 mm) | 15.7 mph (25.3 km/h) |
| 4th gear | 23.7 in (600 mm) | 22.5 mph (36.2 km/h) |
| 5th gear | 28.3 in (720 mm) | 26.8 mph (43.1 km/h) |
| 6th gear | 42.4 in (1,080 mm) | 40.1 mph (64.5 km/h) |

=== Wide-ratio vs. close-ratio transmission ===
A close-ratio transmission is a transmission in which there is a relatively little difference between the gear ratios of the gears. For example, a transmission with an engine shaft to drive shaft ratio of 4:1 in first gear and 2:1 in second gear would be considered wide-ratio when compared to another transmission with a ratio of 4:1 in first and 3:1 in second. This is because the close-ratio transmission has less of a progression between gears. For the wide-ratio transmission, the first gear ratio is 4:1 or 4, and in second gear it is 2:1 or 2, so the progression is equal to 4/2 = 2 (or 200%). For the close-ratio transmission, first gear has a 4:1 ratio or 4, and second gear has a ratio of 3:1 or 3, so the progression between gears is 4/3, or 133%. Since 133% is less than 200%, the transmission with the smaller progression between gears is considered close-ratio. However, the difference between a close-ratio and wide-ratio transmission is subjective and relative.

Close-ratio transmissions are generally offered in sports cars, sport bikes, and especially in race vehicles, where the engine is tuned for maximum power in a narrow range of operating speeds, and the driver or rider can be expected to shift often to keep the engine in its power band.

Factory four- or five-speed transmission ratios generally have a greater difference between gear ratios and tend to be effective for ordinary driving and moderate performance use. Wider gaps between ratios allow a higher 1st gear ratio for better manners in traffic, but cause engine speed to decrease more when shifting. Narrowing the gaps will increase acceleration at speed, and potentially improve top speed under certain conditions, but acceleration from a stopped position and operation in daily driving will suffer.

Range is the torque multiplication difference between 1st and 4th gears; wider-ratio gear-sets have more, typically between 2.8 and 3.2. This is the single most important determinant of low-speed acceleration from stopped.

Progression is the reduction or decay in the percentage drop in engine speed in the next gear, for example after shifting from first to second gear. Most transmissions have some degree of progression in that the RPM drop on the first–second shift is larger than the RPM drop on the second–third shift, which is in turn larger than the RPM drop on the third–fourth shift. The progression may not be linear (continuously reduced) or done in proportionate stages for various reasons, including a special need for a gear to reach a specific speed or RPM for passing, racing and so on, or simply economic necessity that the parts were available.

Range and progression are not mutually exclusive, but each limits the number of options for the other. A wide range, which gives a strong torque multiplication in first gear for excellent manners in low-speed traffic, especially with a smaller motor, heavy vehicle, or numerically low axle ratio such as 2.50, means the progression percentages must be high. The amount of engine speed, and therefore power, lost on each up-shift is greater than would be the case in a transmission with less range, but less power in first gear. A numerically low first gear, such as 2:1, reduces available torque in 1st gear, but allows more choices of progression.

There is no optimal choice of transmission gear ratios or a final drive ratio for best performance at all speeds, as gear ratios are compromises, and not necessarily better than the original ratios for certain purposes.

== See also ==
- Beveled gear
- Continuously variable transmission (CVT)
- Epicyclic gearing - related to turboprop reduction gear boxes
- Machine (mechanical)
- Mechanism (engineering)
- Outline of machines
- Powertrain
- Virtual work
- Wheel train (horology)
