= Bevel gear =

Cone- or frustum-shaped gears for shafts whose axes intersect

Bevel gears are gears in which the axes of the two shafts intersect and the tooth-bearing faces of the gears themselves are conically shaped. Bevel gears are most often mounted on shafts that are 90 degrees apart, but can be designed to work at other angles as well. The pitch surface of bevel gears is a cone, known as a pitch cone. Bevel gears change the axis of rotation of rotational power delivery and are widely used in mechanical settings.

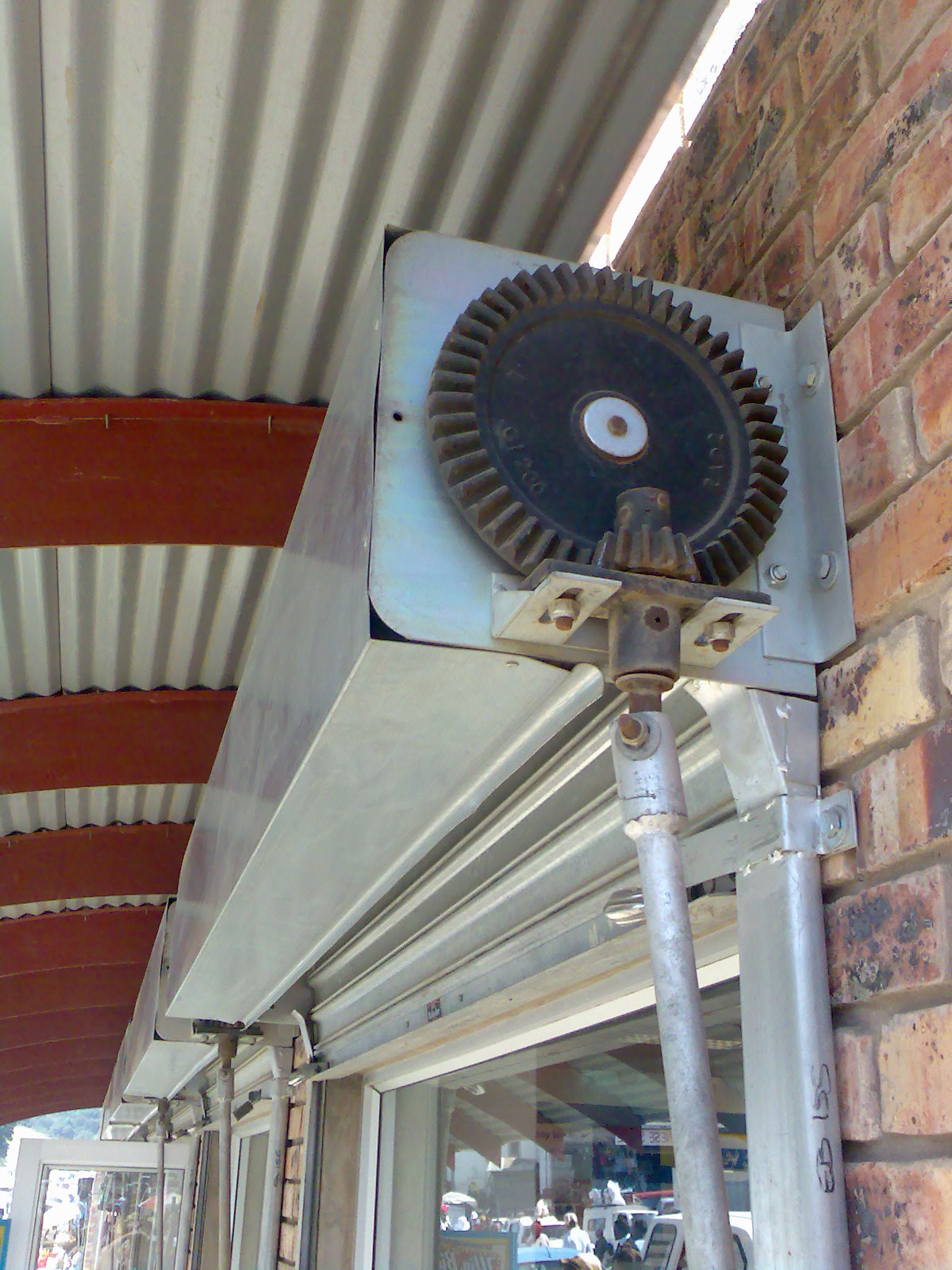
Bevel gear on roller shutter door

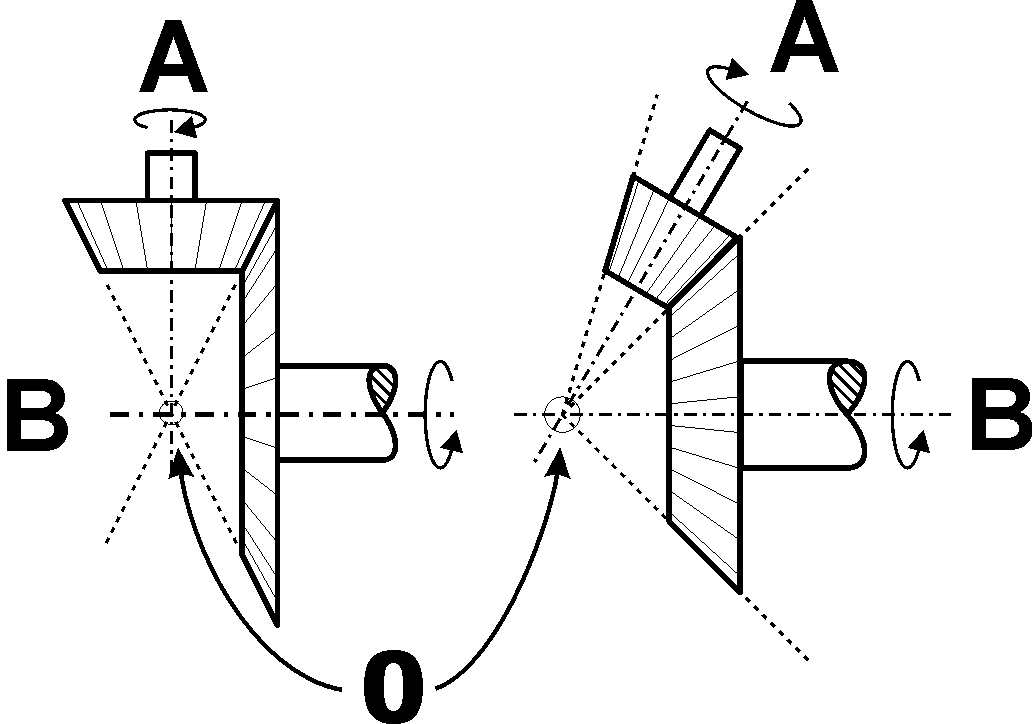
Regardless of the operating angle, the gear axes must intersect (at a point O)

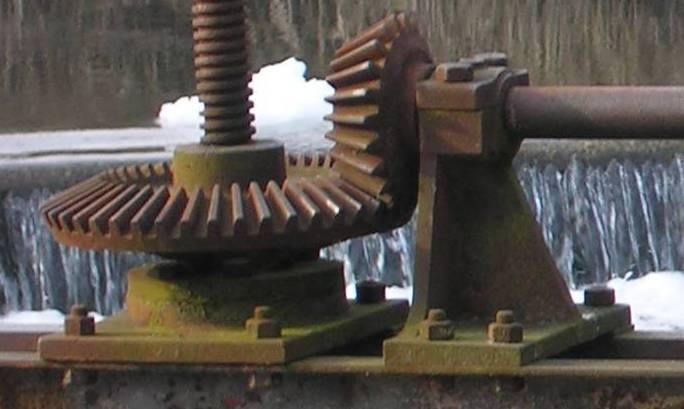
Bevel gear lifts floodgate by means of central screw.

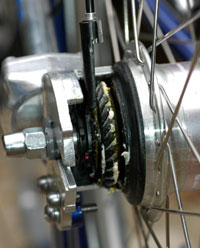
Bevel ring gear on the rear wheel of a shaft-driven bicycle

Spiral bevel gear

== Introduction ==
Two important concepts in gearing are pitch surface and pitch angle. The pitch surface of a gear is the imaginary toothless surface given by averaging out the peaks and valleys of the individual teeth. The pitch surface of an ordinary gear is the shape of a cylinder. The pitch angle of a gear is the angle between the face of the pitch surface and the axis.

The most familiar kinds of bevel gears have pitch angles of less than 90 degrees and therefore are cone-shaped. This type of bevel gear is called external because the gear teeth point outward. The pitch surfaces of meshed external bevel gears are coaxial with the gear shafts; the apexes of the two surfaces are at the point of intersection of the shaft axes.

The use of a genuine bevel gear has even greater importance for the reliability of the axle than any other spare part. Bevel gears that have pitch angles of greater than ninety degrees have teeth that point inward and are called internal bevel gears.

Bevel gears that have pitch angles of exactly 90 degrees have teeth that point outward parallel with the axis and resemble the points on a crown, hence the name crown gear.

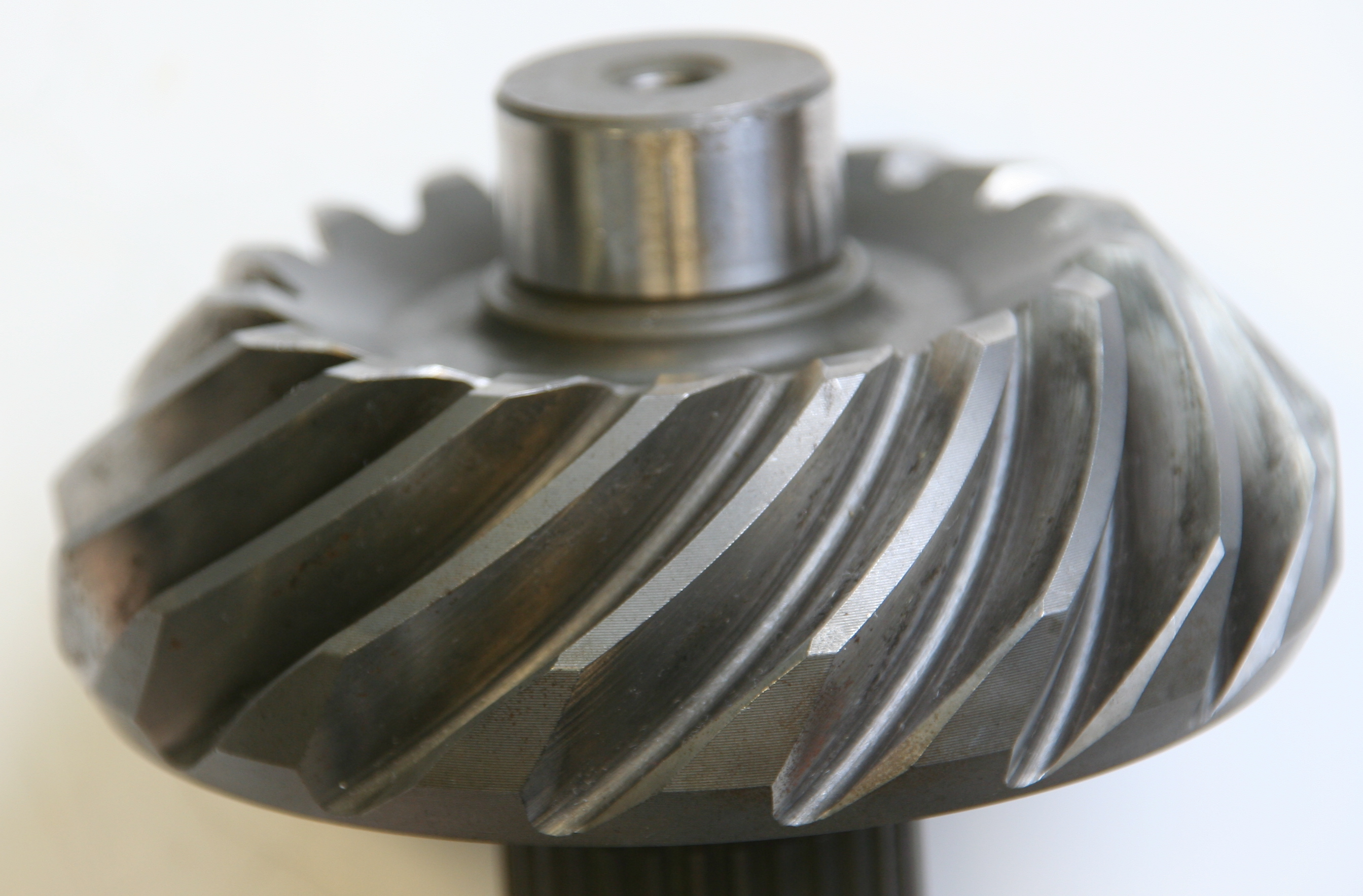
Hypoid bevel gear

== Mitre gears ==
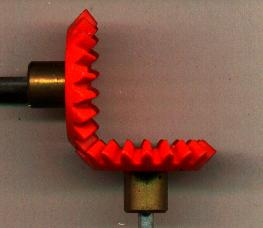
Miter gears

Mitre gears are a special case of bevel gears that have equal numbers of teeth. The shafts are positioned at right angles from each other, and the gears have matching pitch surfaces and angles, with a conically shaped pitch surface.

Mitre gears are useful for transmitting rotational motion at a 90-degree angle with a 1:1 ratio.

== Geometry of a bevel gear ==
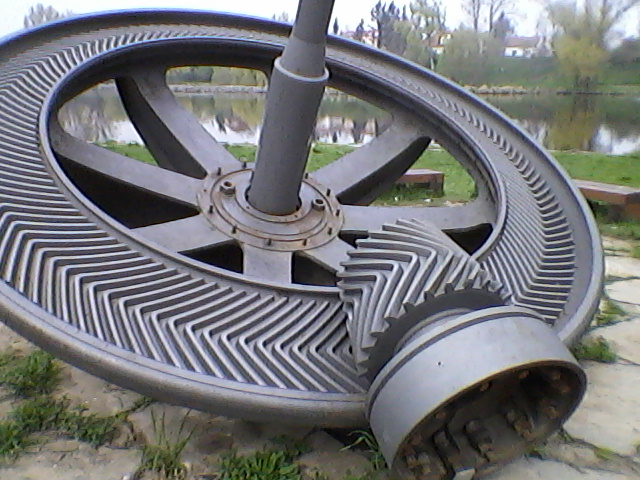
A double-helical bevel gear made by Citroën in 1927 for the Miřejovice water power plant

The cylindrical gear tooth profile corresponds to an involute (i.e. a triangle wave projected on the circumference of a circle), whereas the bevel gear tooth profile is an octoid (i.e. a triangle wave projected on the normal path of a circle of a sphere). All traditional bevel gear generators (such as Gleason, Klingelnberg, Heidenreich & Harbeck, WMW Modul) manufacture bevel gears with an octoidal tooth profile. IMPORTANT: For 5-axis milled bevel gear sets it is important to choose the same calculation / layout like the conventional manufacturing method. Simplified calculated bevel gears on the basis of an equivalent cylindrical gear in normal section with an involute tooth form show a deviant tooth form with reduced tooth strength by 10-28% without offset and 45% with offset [Diss. Hünecke, TU Dresden]. Furthermore, those "involute bevel gear sets" cause more noise.

== Teeth ==
There are two issues regarding tooth shape. One is the cross-sectional profile of the individual tooth. The other is the line or curve on which the tooth is set on the face of the gear: in other words the line or curve along which the cross-sectional profile is projected to form the actual three-dimensional shape of the tooth. The primary effect of both the cross-sectional profile and the tooth line or curve is on the smoothness of operation of the gears. Some result in a smoother gear action than others.

== Tooth line ==
The teeth on bevel gears can be straight, spiral or "zerol".

=== Straight tooth lines ===
In straight bevel gears, the teeth are straight and parallel to the generators of the cone. This is the simplest form of bevel gear. It resembles a spur gear, only conical rather than cylindrical. The gears in the floodgate picture are straight bevel gears. In straight bevel gear sets, when each tooth engages, it impacts the corresponding tooth and simply curving the gear teeth can solve this problem.

=== Spiral tooth lines ===
Spiral bevel gears have their teeth formed along spiral lines. They are somewhat analogous to cylindrical type helical gears in that the teeth are angled; however, with spiral gears, the teeth are also curved.

The advantage of the spiral tooth over the straight tooth is that they engage more gradually. The contact between the teeth starts at one end of the gear and then spreads across the whole tooth. This results in a less abrupt transfer of force when a new pair of teeth come into play. With straight bevel gears, the abrupt tooth engagement causes more noise, especially at high speeds, and impact stress on the teeth which makes them unable to take heavy loads at high speeds without breaking. For these reasons, straight bevel gears are generally limited to use at linear speeds less than 1000 feet/min; or, for small gears, under 1000 rpm.

=== Zerol tooth lines ===
Zerol bevel gears are an intermediate type between straight and spiral bevel gears. Their teeth are curved, but not angled. Zerol bevel gears are designed with the intent of duplicating the characteristics of a straight bevel gear, but they are produced using a spiral bevel cutting process.

== Manufacturing bevel gears ==
=== Materials used in gear manufacturing process ===
Bevel gearing

== Applications ==
The bevel gear has many diverse applications such as locomotives, marine applications, automobiles, printing presses, cooling towers, power plants, steel plants, railway track inspection machines, etc.

For examples, see the following articles on:

- Bevel gears are used in differential drives, which can transmit power to two axles spinning at different speeds, such as those on a cornering automobile.
- Bevel gears are used as the main mechanism for a hand drill. As the handle of the drill is turned in a vertical direction, the bevel gears change the rotation of the chuck to a horizontal rotation. The bevel gears in a hand drill have the added advantage of increasing the speed of rotation of the chuck and this makes it possible to drill a range of materials.
- Spiral bevel gears are important components on rotorcraft drive systems. These components are required to operate at high speeds, high loads, and for a large number of load cycles. In this application, spiral bevel gears are used to redirect the shaft from the horizontal gas turbine engine to the vertical rotor. Bevel gears are also used as speed reducers

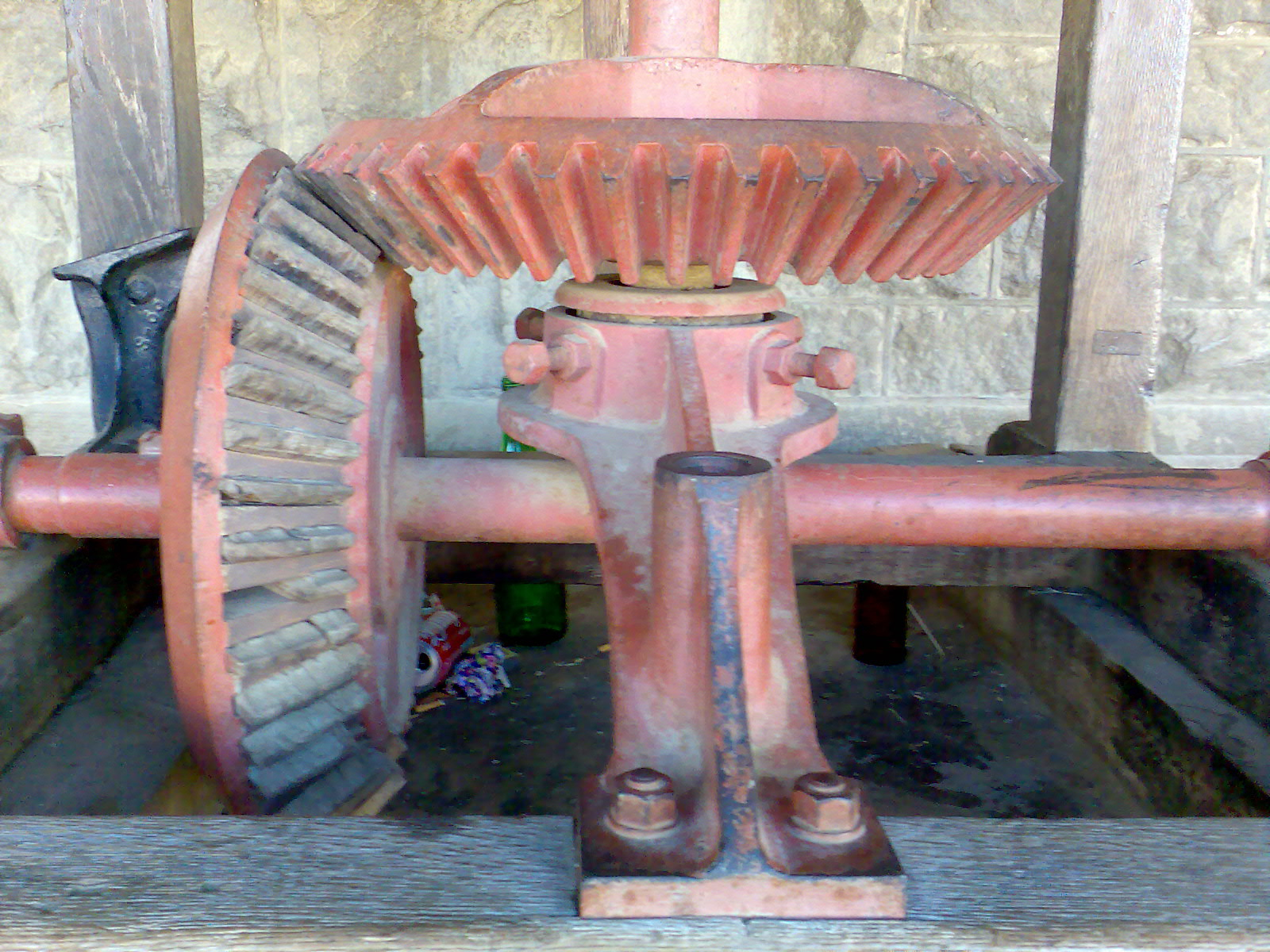
Bevel gears on grain mill at Dordrecht. Note wooden teeth inserts on one of the gears.

== Advantages ==
- This gear makes it possible to change the operating angle.
- Differing of the number of teeth (effectively diameter) on each wheel allows mechanical advantage to be changed. By increasing or decreasing the ratio of teeth between the drive and driven wheels one may change the ratio of rotations between the two, meaning that the rotational drive and torque of the second wheel can be changed in relation to the first, with speed increasing and torque decreasing, or speed decreasing and torque increasing.

== Disadvantages ==
- One wheel of such gear is designed to work with its complementary wheel and no other.
- Must be precisely mounted.
- The shafts' bearings must be capable of supporting significant forces.

== See also ==
- Crown gear
- Pitch cone
- Front cone
- Back cone
