= Alliance for Gray Market and Counterfeit Abatement =

- Formation: 2001; 25 years ago
- Type: Non-profit alliance
- Purpose: Raise awareness of and address the global impact of intellectual property rights issues
- Region served: Worldwide
- Members: 15 companies
- President: Sally Nguyen, Microsoft
- Main organ: Executive Board
- Website: www.agmaglobal.org

The Alliance for Gray Market and Counterfeit Abatement (AGMA) is an American alliance of information technology (IT) companies that works to educate and raise awareness on counterfeiting; digital IP protection; service and warranty abuse; and the gray market. The term grey market refers to the sale of branded goods by unauthorized third parties. The organization is a District of Columbia-based non-profit organization that serves members worldwide.

The organization was founded in 2001 by companies including Cisco, Hewlett-Packard and Microsoft. Its efforts include preventing unauthorized online sales of billions of dollars' worth of technology products produced by its members.

== History ==
AGMA was founded in September 2001 by several technology companies including Cisco Systems, Hewlett-Packard (HP), Nortel Networks, and Xerox Corporation. Its charter was to educate consumers of the risks of purchasing products from unauthorized channels. Marie Myers from HP served as the group's first President.

In 2002, the group broadened its charter to address counterfeit issues in the technology industry, and additional members joined.

In 2003, AGMA released its first gray market study, commissioned in conjunction with professional services company KPMG. The report indicated that two-thirds of the products most often purchased from gray market sources were enterprise related, such as servers, hard drives and memory. Network products were 11 percent of the problem, and printer cartridges were about 6 percent of the items found on the gray secondary market.

In 2004, the group expanded its focus from North America to Europe, the Middle East, Africa, and the Asia-Pacific region, with the addition of regional councils.

In November 2007, Ram Manchi, Cisco's director of global business controls became AGMA's second President.

In 2008, a follow up study commissioned by the group indicated that gray market activity was increasing, but not at the same rate of authorized technology sales increases. The study also reported incentives and reporting policies to reduce gray market activity.

In 2009, power and cooling equipment provider APC by Schneider Electric joined the group.

In 2010, accounting firm Deloitte and Touche joined AGMA, reportedly due to concerns about counterfeit warranty and service abuse.

In October 2017, the group reported that its members were continuing to see negative revenue effects from warranty fraud and service abuse, as much as five per cent.

== Activities ==
The group's activities focus on raising awareness in four areas: counterfeiting; digital IP protection; service and warranty abuse; and the gray market.

Service abuse is the unauthorized use of services and support, and warranty abuse occurs when a partner provides service on out of warranty products. The group has recommended partner service audits every other year to prevent these types of abuse.

== Membership ==
The organization listed 15 members as of April 2018. Members share collaborative strategies, programs and effective practices to address counterfeiting, gray marketing and service abuse in the IT sector.

== Organizational structure ==
AGMA has a board of directors and each member serves as a director. The group is led by a president. Microsoft's Sally Nguyen was the President as of April 2018.
