= Cycloid gear =

Toothed gear based on epicycloids and hypocycloids

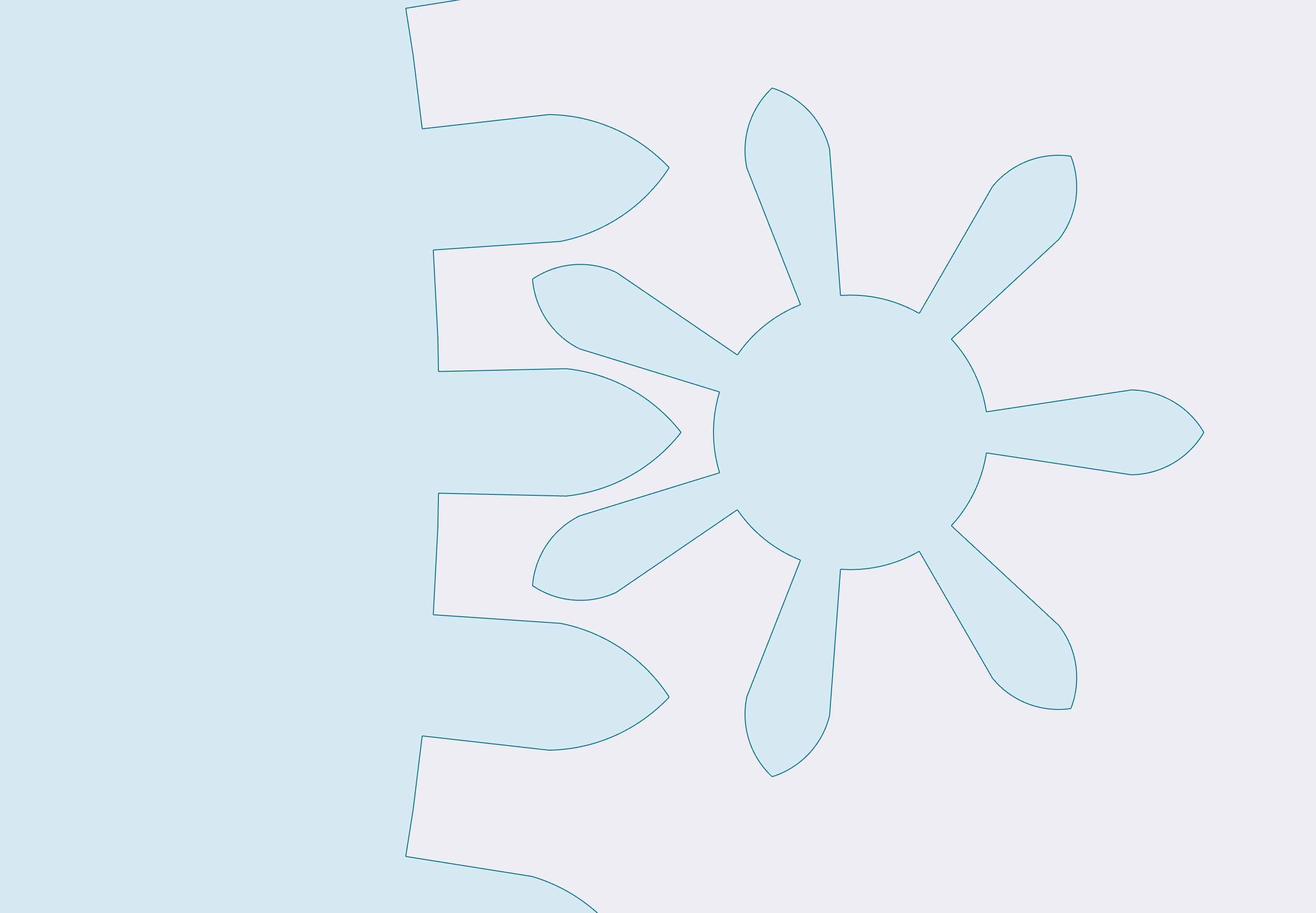
Drawing showing the tooth and leaf profile of a cycloidal wheel and pinion

A cycloidal gear is a toothed gear with a cycloidal profile. Such gears are used in mechanical clocks and watches, rather than the involute gear form used for most other gears. Cycloidal gears have advantages over involute gears in such applications in being able to be produced flat (making them easier to polish, and thereby reduce friction), and having fewer points of contact (both reducing friction and wear).

Their gear tooth profile is based on the epicycloid and hypocycloid curves, which are the curves generated by a circle rolling around the outside and inside of another circle, respectively.

== Characteristics ==
When two toothed gears mesh, an imaginary circle, the pitch circle, can be drawn around the centre of either gear through the point where their teeth make contact. The curves of the teeth outside the pitch circle are known as the addenda, and the curves of the tooth spaces inside the pitch circle are known as the dedenda. An addendum of one gear rests inside a dedendum of the other gear.

In the cycloidal gears, the addenda of the wheel teeth are convex epi-cycloidal and the dedenda of the pinion are concave hypocycloidal curves generated by the same generating circle. This ensures that the motion of one gear is transferred to the other at locally constant angular velocity.

The size of the generating circle may be freely chosen, mostly independent of the number of teeth.

Construction of a two-lobed cycloidal rotor. The red curve is an epicycloid and the blue curve is a hypocycloid.

A Roots blower is one extreme, a form of cycloid gear where the ratio of the pitch diameter to the generating circle diameter equals twice the number of lobes. In a two-lobed blower, the generating circle is one-fourth the diameter of the pitch circles, and the teeth form complete epi- and hypo-cycloidal arcs.

== In clock and watch making ==
Cycloidal gears are used in clock and watch making, for three reasons.

1. To reduce friction, watch and clock movements require teeth and pinion leaves to be polished. Cycloidal gears can be designed so that the pinions have flat surfaces. This makes them easier to polish without adversely changing their profile.

2. The gear trains used in clocks and watches have multiple stages of wheels and pinions in which the pinions have few leaves. Involute designs for these leaves would be undercut, making them too fragile and difficult to manufacture.

3. A large aspect of the design of watch and clock movements is the minimisation of friction. Involute gear teeth often mesh with 2 to 3 points of contact at once. Cycloidal gears can be made so there are only 1 to 2 points of contact. Since there is always some friction at these meshing points, cycloidal profiles are preferred in horology. Horological gear teeth are usually not lubricated (only their pivots are). Oil viscosity can have a detrimental effect on time keeping. Also, since these mechanisms are expected to run constantly for years between servicing, lubrication can become contaminated with dirt and debris and effectively turn into grinding paste. This can damage the wheels and pinions to the point they must be replaced. However, even well-made cycloidal wheels and pinions are subject to this wear due to friction, dirt and oil migration from pivot bearings and other places. This is one of the reasons regular servicing of watches and clocks is essential for their precision and longevity.

In clockmaking, the generating circle diameter is commonly chosen to be one-half the pitch diameter of one of the gears. This results in a dedendum which is a simple straight radial line, and therefore easy to shape and polish with hand tools. The addenda are not complete epicycloids, but portions of two different ones which intersect at a point, resulting in a "gothic arch" tooth profile.

A limitation of this gearform is that meshing is only precise on the pitch circle, with the result that where vibration is likely an involute profile is usually preferred. However in clockmaking, particularly prior to the application of mass production, it was common to cut a pair of wheels (or a wheel plus a lantern pinion) and then to use a depthing tool to mark out the pivot positions on the plates: that pivot distance was correct for that specific pair of wheels, and not for any others.

== Invention ==
There is some dispute over the invention of cycloidal gears. Those involved include Gérard Desargues, Philippe de La Hire, Ole Rømer, and Charles Étienne Louis Camus.

== Relationship to involute profile gears ==
A cycloid (as used for the flank shape of a cycloidal gear) is constructed by rolling a rolling circle on a base circle. If the diameter of this rolling circle is chosen to be infinitely large, a rolling straight line is obtained. The resulting cycloid is then called an involute and the gear is called an involute gear. In this respect involute gears are only a special case of cycloidal gears.

== See also ==
- Cycloidal drive
