= Pressure angle =

Angle on a gear

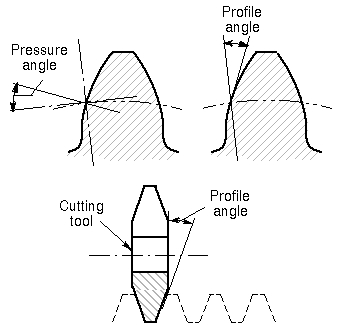
Pressure angles

Pressure angle (angle of obliquity) in relation to gear teeth is the angle between the tooth face and the gear wheel tangent. It is more precisely the angle at a pitch point between the line of pressure (which is normal to the tooth surface) and the plane tangent to the pitch surface. The pressure angle gives the direction normal to the tooth profile. The pressure angle is equal to the profile angle at the standard pitch circle and can be termed the "standard" pressure angle at that point.

Standard values are 14.5°, 20°, and 25°. Earlier gears with a 14.5° pressure angle were commonly used because the cosine is larger for a smaller angle, providing less pressure on the bearing; however, teeth with smaller pressure angles are weaker as they have smaller roots. For gears to work together properly, their pressure angles must be matched.

The pressure angle is also the angle of the sides of the trapezoidal teeth on the corresponding rack. The force transmitted during the mating of gear teeth acts along the normal. This force has components along the pitch line and the other along the line perpendicular to the pitch line. The force along the pitch line which is responsible for power transmission is proportional to the cosine of pressure angle. The gear that exerts thrust (perpendicular to the pitch line) is proportional to the sine of pressure angle.

The three types of profile angle are matched by three types of corresponding pressure angle: the transverse pressure angle, the normal pressure angle, and the axial pressure angle.

== See also ==
- List of gear nomenclature
- Involute gear
