= Pinion =

Round gear, usually the smaller of two (meshed) gears

Pinion and annular gear

A pinion is a round gear—usually the smaller of two meshed gears—used in several applications, including drivetrain and rack and pinion systems.

== Applications ==
=== Drivetrain ===
Drivetrains usually feature a gear known as the pinion, which may vary in different systems, including

- the typically smaller gear in a gear drive train (although in the first commercially successful steam locomotive—the Salamanca—the pinion was rather large). In many cases, such as remote controlled toys, the pinion is also the drive gear for a reduction in speed, since electric motors operate at higher speed and lower torque than desirable at the wheels. However the reverse is true in watches, where gear trains commence with a high-torque, low-speed spring and terminate in the fast-and-weak escapement.
- the smaller gear that drives in a 90-degree angle towards a crown gear in a differential drive.
- the small front sprocket on a chain driven motorcycle.
- the clutch bell gear when paired with a centrifugal clutch, in radio-controlled cars with an engine (e.g., nitro).

=== Rack and pinion ===
Rack and pinion animation

In rack and pinion systems, the pinion is the round gear that engages and moves along the linear rack.

== See also ==
- List of gear nomenclature
