= American Gear Manufacturers Association =

- Company type: Non-profit Association
- Industry: Trade Association
- Founded: 1916
- Headquarters: Alexandria, Virginia
- Number of employees: 11 employees
- Website: www.agma.org

The American Gear Manufacturers Association (AGMA) is the trade group of companies involved in gears, couplings and related power transmission components and equipment. AGMA was founded in 1916; as of December 30, 2016, there were 456 member companies listed on the association's website.

AGMA is accredited by the American National Standards Institute (ANSI) to write all U.S. standards on gearing, including terminology, nominal dimensions, tolerances, and tools for manufacturing and control. In 1993, AGMA became the Secretariat for Technical Committee 60 (TC 60) of ISO. TC 60 is the committee responsible for developing all international gearing standards. In addition to the position of Secretariat, AGMA also chairs one-third of the active ISO Working Groups related to gearing.

AGMA hosts the industry's trade show, Gear Expo, every two years. Gear Expo is the only trade show dedicated to the complete gear manufacturing process.

The AGMA Fall Technical Meeting provides paper presentations on the latest applied technical research in the gear and power transmission industry. The FTM is held annually at a different location in the United States each year. It is often held in conjunction with the Gear Expo.
