= Involute gear =

Gear with teeth whose profile is an involute of a circle

Meshing of two spur gears with involute external teeth. z_{1} = 20, z_{2} = 50, α = 20°, x_{1} = x_{2} = 0, ISO 53:1998. The lower (green) gear is the driving one. The line of contact, which is the locus of all teeth contact points, is shown in blue. The contact points are highlighted with bold black dots; either one pair or two pairs of teeth can be meshed at a time (ε = 1,656). It is shown that the common normal to the contacting teeth profiles retains its position during meshing and is a common tangent to the base circles (r_{b}_{1} and r_{b}_{2}), i.e. to the evolutes of the contacting teeth profiles.

Two involute gears, the left driving the right: Blue arrows show the contact forces between them (1) downward force applied by the left gear and (2) upward resistance by the right gear. The force line (or line of action) runs along the long leg of dashed blue line which is a tangent common to both base circles. The involutes here are traced out in converse fashion: points of contact move along the stationary force-vector "string" as if it was being unwound from the left rotating base circle, and wound onto the right rotating base circle. In this situation, there is no force, and so no contact needed, along the opposite [lower left to upper right] common tangent (not shown). In other words, if the teeth were slightly narrower while everything else remained the same there would be a gap above each tooth on the left gear, because downward force is being applied by it.

Construction of an involute curve from the surface of a circle; this can be seen as the path traced by the end of a string being unwound from a disc. Involute gear teeth are not precisely this shape, due to material allowances like fillets et cetera.

The involute gear profile is the most commonly used system for gearing today, with cycloid gearing still used for some specialties such as clocks. In an involute gear, the profiles of the teeth are involutes of a circle. The involute of a circle is the spiraling curve traced by the end of an imaginary taut string unwinding itself from that stationary circle called the base circle, or (equivalently) a triangle wave projected on the circumference of a circle.

== Advantages and design ==
The involute gear profile, sometimes credited to Leonhard Euler, was a fundamental advance in machine design, since unlike with other gear systems, the tooth profile of an involute gear depends only on the number of teeth on the gear, pressure angle, and pitch. That is, a gear's profile does not depend on the gear it mates with. Thus, any two involute spur gears with a given pressure angle and pitch will mate correctly, regardless of how many teeth they have. This dramatically reduces the number of shapes of gears that need to be manufactured and kept in inventory.

In involute gear design, contact between a pair of gear teeth occurs at a single instantaneous point (see figure at right) where two involutes of the same spiral hand meet. Contact on the other side of the teeth is where both involutes are of the other spiral hand. Rotation of the gears causes the location of this contact point to move across the respective tooth surfaces. The tangent at any point of the curve is perpendicular to the generating line irrespective of the mounting distance of the gears. Thus the line of the force follows the generating line, and is thus tangent to the two base circles, and is known as the line of action (also called pressure line or line of contact). When this is true, the gears obey the fundamental law of gearing:

The angular velocity ratio between two gears of a gearset must remain constant throughout the mesh.

This property is required for smooth transmission of power with minimal speed or torque variations as pairs of teeth go into or come out of mesh, but is not required for low-speed gearing.

== Line of action and contact ==
The point where the line of action crosses the line between the two centres is called the pitch point of the gears. The sliding contact friction is zero at this point.

The distance actually covered on the line of action is then called line of contact. The line of contact begins at the intersection between the line of action and the addendum circle of the driven gear and ends at the intersection between the line of action and the addendum circle of the driving gear.

The pressure angle is the acute angle between the line of action and a normal to the line connecting the gear centers. The pressure angle of the gear varies according to the position on the involute shape, but pairs of gears must have the same pressure angle in order for the teeth to mesh properly, so specific portions of the involute must be matched.

== Pressure angle ==
While any pressure angle can be manufactured, the most common stock gears have a 20° pressure angle, with 14½° and 25° pressure angle gears being much less common. Increasing the pressure angle increases the width of the base of the gear tooth, leading to greater strength and load carrying capacity. Decreasing the pressure angle provides lower backlash, smoother operation and less sensitivity to manufacturing errors.

== Types of involute gears ==
Most common stock gears are spur gears with straight teeth. Most gears used in higher-strength applications are helical involute gears where the spirals of the teeth are of different handedness, and the gears rotate in opposite directions. Studies have also been performed on gears having teeth with a non-involute curve profile.

Only used in limited situations are gears where they can rotate in the same direction, and the spirals of the teeth are of the same handedness. The line of action is the external tangent to the base circles and thus analogous to a normal belt drive, whereas normal gears are analogous to a crossed-belt drive such as can be used in limited-slip differentials because of their low efficiencies, and in locking differentials when the efficiencies are less than zero.
