= IGW =

Gear manufacturing company

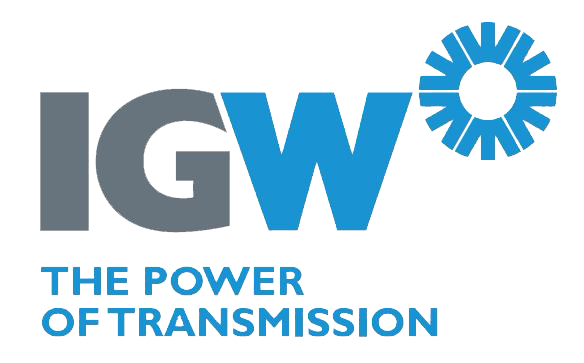
- Industry: Industrial manufacturing
- Founded: 1949 in Belgium
- Headquarters: Oostkamp, Belgium
- Key people: Alfons Watteeuw (Founder) Eric Willekens (CEO)
- Products: Gears, gearboxes, shafts, housings, couplings, services
- Revenue: € 100.000.000 (2014)
- Number of employees: 1,000 (2014)

IGW (Industrial Gears Watteeuw) is an international gear and gearbox manufacturer. The company has its headquarters, IG Watteeuw International nv, in Oostkamp (Belgium). Additionally, it has locations in Brno (Czech Republic), Iași (Romania), Suzhou (China) and Zanesville, Ohio (USA). Globally, IGW employs over 1,000 people.

== Activities ==
IGW focuses on three main markets:

- Transport: design, manufacture, and servicing of gears, gearboxes and couplings for trains, metros, trams, cable cars and marine vehicles.
- Industry: transmission for a wide range of industries, including textile and printing, semiconductors, and the medical and chemical sector.
- Energy: oil and gas rigs, power plants, wind turbines and other applications.

== History ==
=== Foundation ===
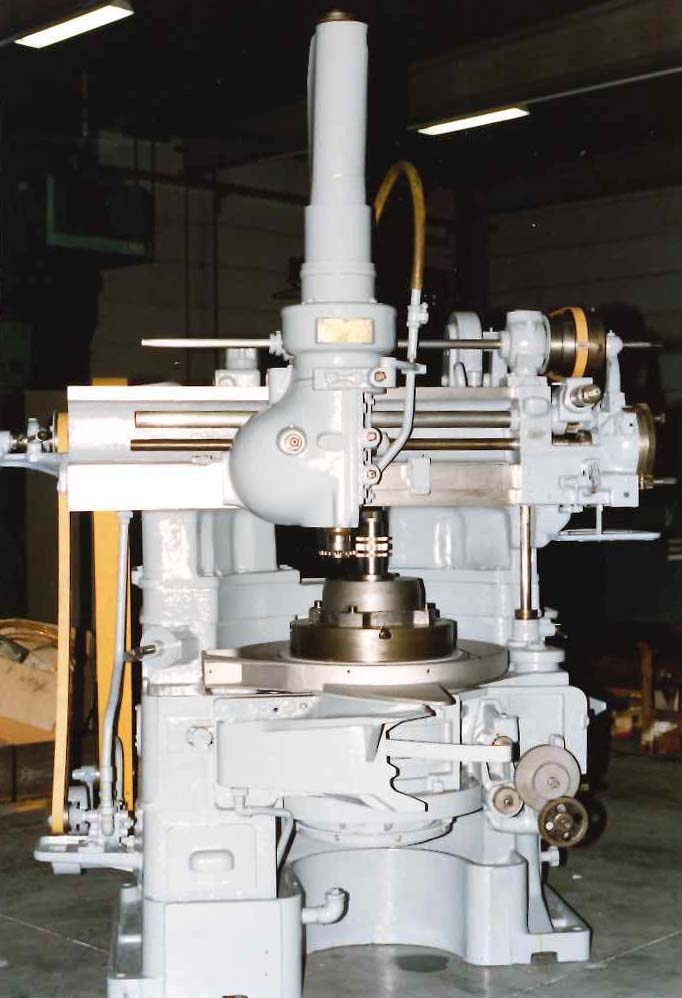
IGW's first Lorenz gear shaping machine, 1949

IGW was founded in 1949 by Alfons Watteeuw who was only 19 years old at the time. His father, Henri Watteeuw, assisted in the creation of the company. He was the first certified technical instructor in West-Flanders. He was a teacher and guest lecturer at the engineering department of the KU Leuven, and technical director of the high school VTI Bruges.

In 1949, Alfons registered his one-man business “Watteeuw Alfons” at the Commercial Court.

Around that time German manufacturing plants were being dismantled as a penalty for the country’s role in the Second World War. Father and son visited a few depots and eventually purchased a Lorenz gear shaping machine, with a diameter capacity of one meter, from the BMW factory in München.

=== Commercial development ===
Alfons Watteeuw received his first large-scale order in 1964. The Belgian company Arpic Engineering, later acquired by Atlas Copco, placed an order with Watteeuw.

In 1976 Watteeuw got its first purchase from Atlas Copco in the United States. The company later established international partnerships, including an agreement with CNH Industrial to supply components for New Holland agricultural machinery.

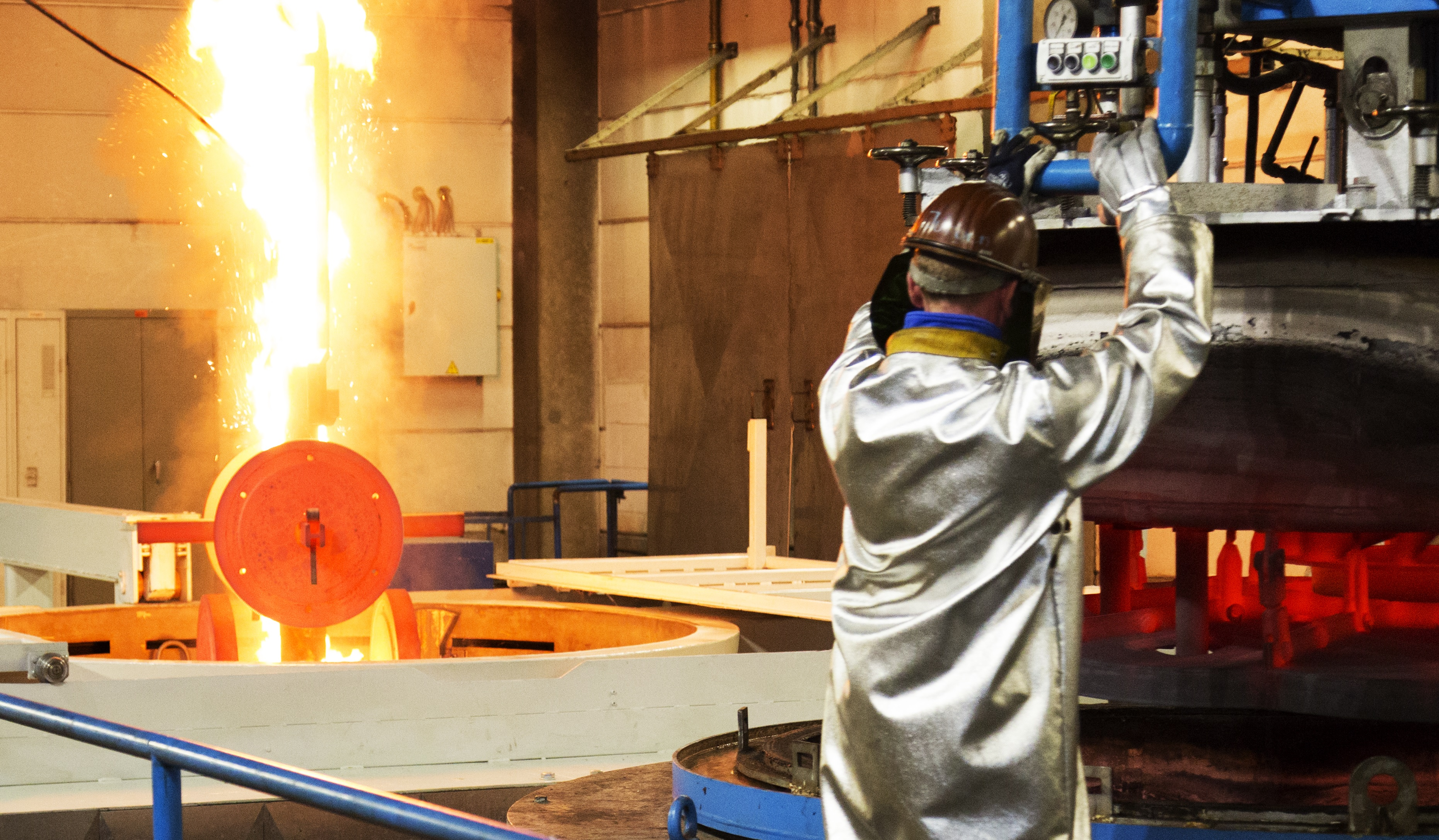
Heat treatment at IGW

Following production for agricultural machinery, the company expanded into the aerospace industry. In the early eighties, Watteeuw became the supplier of the slat rack wing mechanism for Airbus.

Henri Watteeuw died in 1986. In 1987 the company, by that time named “MC Watteeuw” (Mechanische Constructie Watteeuw / Mechanical Construction Watteeuw), moved to the Kampveldstraat 51 in Oostkamp, where the main offices and factory are still established.

Soon after the move, Watteeuw invested in heat treatment, vertically integrating its gear production.

=== Acquisition by BMT ===
To finance further growth, and seeing that his children weren’t planning to take over the company, Alfons Watteeuw started looking for an industrial partner in the early nineties. In 1992, Belgium’s longest listed holding BMT took over 60% of the shares in Watteeuw International. Over the years BMT’s participation grew to 100%. The group's investments played a significant role in the further expansion of Watteeuw. BMT (and with it Watteeuw) stayed listed until 2004.

=== International expansion ===
In 1997, the company built a new factory in Brno, Czech Republic, and transferred its production line for New Holland agricultural gears to the facility.

In 1998, Watteeuw acquired the maintenance department of Terom, Romania's biggest synthetic fiber company at the time. Watteeuw locally produced gears for their machines and provided servicing jobs. When Terom shut down a few years later, Watteeuw bought a part of the remaining factory to offer its services to other customers in the region.

The company also expanded its aerospace operations. In 2000 BMT took over the American company Caratron Industries, manufacturer of precision gears, axles and gearboxes, for aeronautic and space devices. Caraton and Eurair, Watteeuw’s subsidiary that delivered to Airbus, were afterwards turned into a new division: BMT Aerospace.

During the 2000s, Watteeuw entered the medical, marine, and energy sectors, manufacturing components such as gears for wind turbines.

The company also established plants and warehouses in Asia. Since 2001, Watteeuw has activities in China, initially through a joint-venture with Picanol in the regional branch of AmTech. Watteeuw took over Picanol’s shares in 2006. The Chinese facility produces railway applications for the Asian market, following the company's entry into the railway supply sector in the 1990s.

In 2013, Watteeuw expanded to the United States. In 2014, the company changed its name from IG Watteeuw to IGW.

Alfons Watteeuw died on April 1, 2014.

== Corporate governance ==
IGW is currently 100% owned by the BMT group. BMT has activities in the glass industry, with subsidiaries OMCO, Kite and CNUD-EFCO, and the gear manufacturing industry with IGW and BTM Aerospace.
