= Gear cutting =

Process used to create a gear

Gear cutting is any machining process for creating a gear. The most common gear-cutting processes include hobbing, broaching, milling, grinding, and skiving. Such cutting operations may occur either after or instead of forming processes such as forging, extruding, investment casting, or sand casting.

Gears are commonly made from metal, plastic, and wood. Although gear cutting is a substantial industry, many metal and plastic gears are made without cutting, by processes such as die casting or injection molding. Some metal gears made with powder metallurgy require subsequent machining, whereas others are complete after sintering. Likewise, metal or plastic gears made with additive manufacturing may or may not require finishing by cutting, depending on application.

== Processes ==
=== Broaching ===
For very large gears or spline, a vertical broach is used. It consists of a vertical rail that carries a single tooth cutter formed to create the tooth shape. A rotary table and a Y axis are the customary axes available. Some machines will cut to a depth on the Y axis and index the rotary table automatically. The largest gears are produced on these machines.

Other operations such as broaching work particularly well for cutting teeth on the inside. The downside to this is that it is expensive and different broach sticks are required to make different sized gears. Therefore, it is mostly used in very high production runs.

=== Hobbing ===
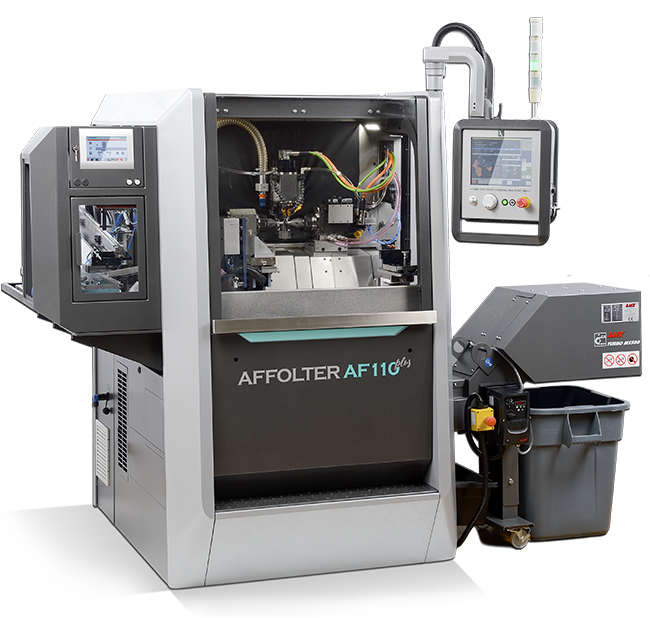
A horizontal CNC gear hobbing machine

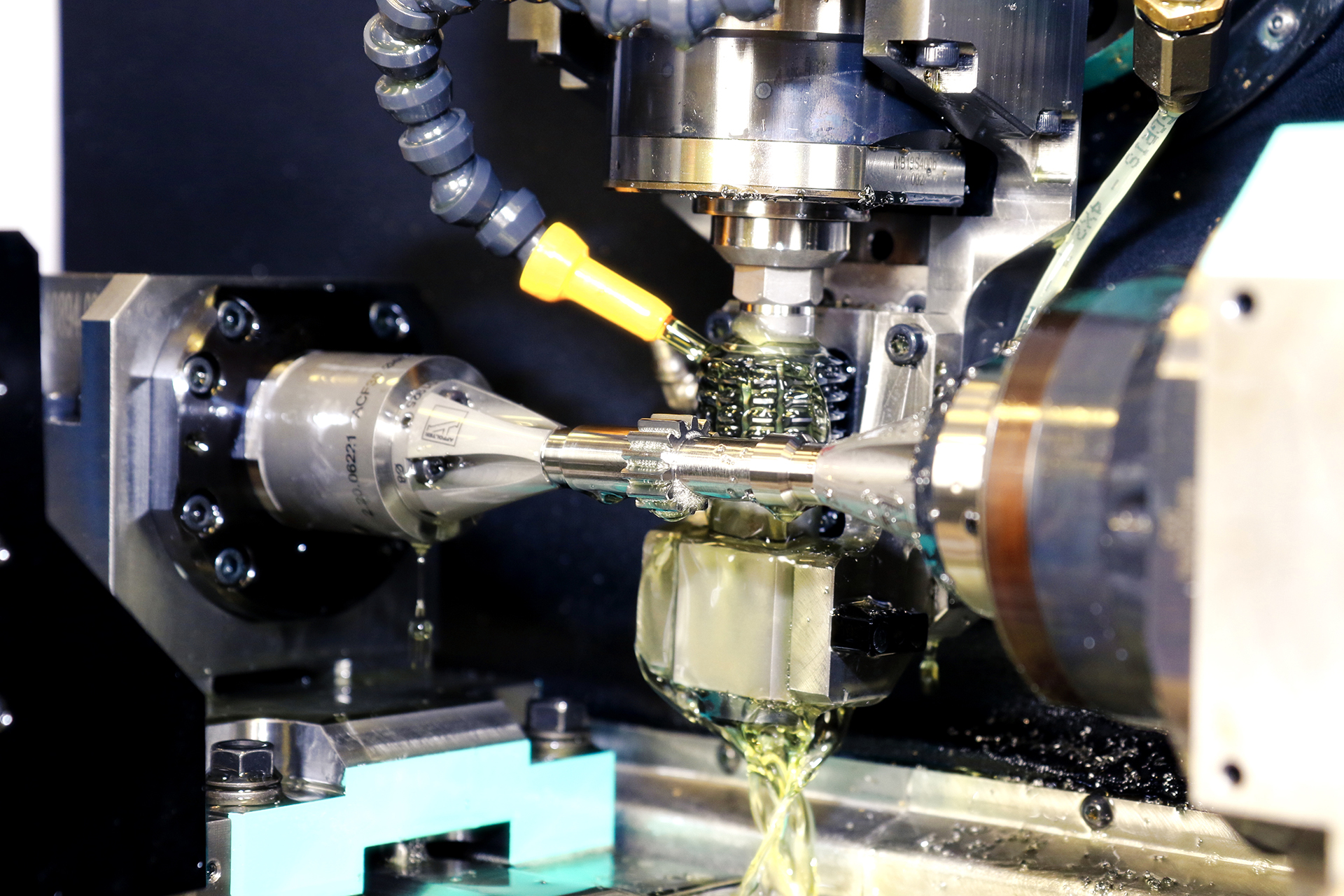
Gear hobbing a spur gear to module 17dp on CNC cutting machine

Hobbing is a method by which a hob is used to cut teeth into a blank. We gear hobbing with a master hob or index hob on CNC gear hobbing machines who cut, gears, wheels, pinions, shafts and worms. The cutter and gear blank are rotated at the same time to transfer the profile of the hob onto the gear blank. Used very often for all sizes of production runs, but works best for medium to high. The hobbing features for gears are straight, helical, straight bevel, face, crowned, worm, cylkro and chamfering.

=== Milling or grinding ===
Spur may be cut or ground on a milling machine or jig grinder utilizing a numbered gear cutter, and any indexing head or rotary table. The number of the gear cutter is determined by the tooth count of the gear to be cut.

To machine a helical gear on a manual machine, a true indexing fixture must be used. Indexing fixtures can disengage the drive worm, and be attached via an external gear train to the machine table's handle (like a power feed). It then operates similarly to a carriage on a lathe. As the table moves on the X axis, the fixture will rotate in a fixed ratio with the table. The indexing fixture itself receives its name from the original purpose of the tool: moving the table in precise, fixed increments. If the indexing worm is not disengaged from the table, one can move the table in a highly controlled fashion via the indexing plate to produce linear movement of great precision (such as a vernier scale).

There are a few different types of cutters used when creating gears. One is a rack shaper. These are straight and move in a direction tangent to the gear, while the gear. They have six to twelve teeth and eventually have to be moved back to the starting point to begin another cut.

=== Shaping ===
The old method of gear cutting is mounting a gear blank in a shaper and using a tool shaped in the profile of the tooth to be cut. This method also works for cutting internal splines.

Another is a pinion-shaped cutter that is used in a gear shaper machine. It is basically when a cutter that looks similar to a gear cuts a gear blank. The cutter and the blank must have a rotating axis parallel to each other. This process works well for low and high production runs.

=== Finishing ===
After being cut the gear can be finished by shaving, burnishing, grinding, honing or lapping.
