= Skive =

Skive or skiving may refer to:

- Skive, Denmark, a place in Denmark
  - Skive Municipality
  - Skive Airport
  - Skive railway station
  - Skive fH, a handball club
  - Skive IK, a football club
- Skiving (leathercraft), the thinning of a piece of leather using a sharp tool
- Skiving (metalworking), the process of cutting material off in slices
- Skiving off, a British term for slacking or truancy

== See also ==
- Skiving machine, to cut material off in slices, usually metal, but also leather or laminates
