= Gear manufacturing =

Manufacture of machine parts

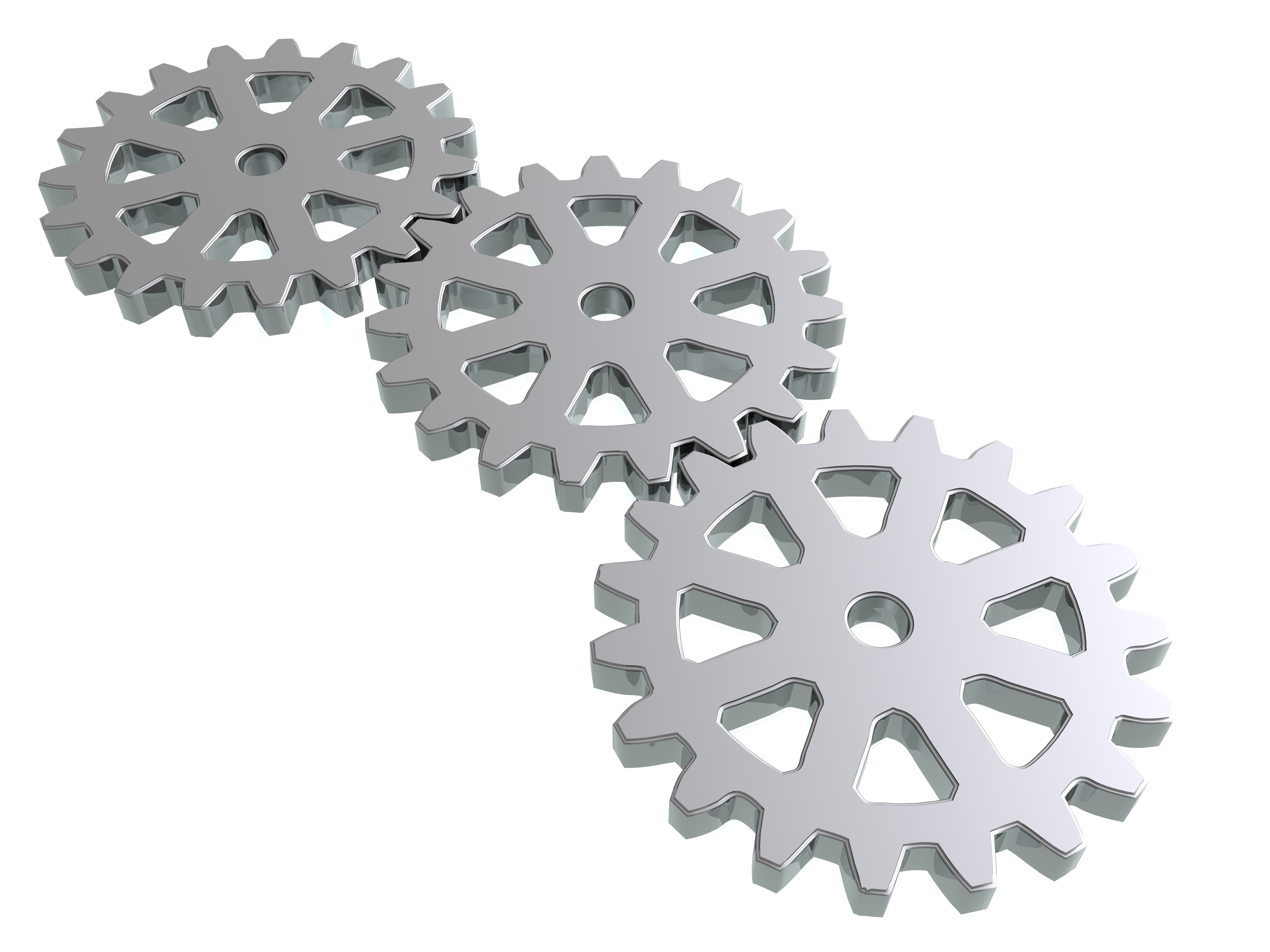
Metal gears

Gears can be manufactured by a variety of processes, including casting, forging, extrusion, powder metallurgy, and blanking, shaping, grinding, and Computer Numerical Control (CNC) machining. As a general rule, however, machining is applied to achieve the final dimensions, shape and surface finish in the gear. The initial operations that produce a semifinishing part ready for gear machining as referred to as blanking operations; the starting product in gear machining is called a gear blank. The manufacturing process has evolved with the technology given in production starting with most gears being produced by hand to now being produced by multiple methods.

== History ==
The origin of gears dates back as early as 4th century China. Gears were also found in recorded work of the ancient Greeks and Romans. The ancient Greek mathematician Archimedes advanced the understanding and application of gears. Early gears were typically made of wood or stone, later using bronze gears. During the Middle Ages, gears began to be crafted out of various metals to accommodate for the need for durability and precision. During the Industrial Revolution, gears were used in powering the machinery and factories, leading to advancements in gear manufacturing. This led to mass production of gears and other metal components.

== Gear properties ==
The gear material should have the following properties:

- High tensile strength to prevent failure against static loads
- High endurance strength to withstand dynamic loads
- Low coefficient of friction
- Good manufacturability

=== List of materials ===
Gears can be made with a variety of metals including

- Steel
- Brass
- Cast iron
- Aluminum
- Plastics
- Bronze
- Powdered metals

== Uses ==
There are many uses for gears besides engineering and constructive purposes. Gears serve a purpose in a wide range of industries such as:

Automotive:

- Gears are essential as they are part of most transmission systems. These systems allow the user to switch gears, and to change both the power and speed of the vehicle to suit whatever driving conditions are necessary
- Along with changing the speed and power, gears are also used for steering systems such as a steering wheel which allows for changing the direction of rotational motion

Clockwork:

- Gears are the pillar of traditional clock mechanisms, using many gears to translate small amounts of energy or work to keep up with the precise measurements of time
- These gears are smaller than others but the intricate design allows for great longevity and accuracy with timekeeping

Robotics:

- Similar to cars, gears enable precise movements and also greater control and robotic mechanisms
- Because of their ability to change speeds intricately and transmit power, they are integral to robotic manufacturing, healthcare, and exploration missions
- Their efficiency also leads to many developments in robotics, helping to achieve more difficult tasks that humans would not be able to do alone

Renewable Energy:

- Wind turbines use gears as one of the main components for energy generation
- Gears increase in speed with the wind which helps to generate energy
- Hydroelectric generators utilize gears to generate energy

Nuclear Power:

- Nuclear reactors use gears in flow control systems to help regulate coolant flow, which helps to ensure the safety of nuclear plants

== Gear manufacturing processes ==
There are multiple ways in which gear blanks can be shaped through the cutting and finishing processes.

=== Gear forming ===
In gear form cutting, the cutting edge of the cutting tool has a shape identical with the shape of the space between the gear teeth. Two machining operations, milling and broaching can be employed to form cut gear teeth.

CNC Machining:

- Computer Numerical Control (CNC)
- A process that produces accurate gears by using computer programs to cut and shape the gear
- This allows for precise gears, making it suitable for both mass production and jobs where precision is required more

Forging:

- A process where metal is heated and shaped to form products
- Forging produces more durable gears which are used for more industrial jobs

==== Form milling ====
- In form milling, the cutter called a form cutter travels axially along the length of the gear tooth at the appropriate depth to produce the gear tooth
- After each tooth is cut, the cutter is withdrawn, the gear blank is rotated, and the cutter proceeds to cut another tooth
- The process continues until all teeth are cut

Grinding:

- Grinding is a method that is used to improve surface quality as well as the precision of gears
- Makes a smoother and more refined gear
- This process is used more for gears that require higher tolerance for fields such as aerospace

Casting:

- Casting is a method where molten metal is pulled into a mold to create gears. It is also one of the more older methods of creating gears
- Casting is used for producing strong and durable gears for machinery and other industrial tasks

Broaching:

- Broaching can also be used to produce gear teeth and is particularly applicable to internal teeth
- The process is rapid and produces fine surface finish with high dimensional accuracy
- Because broaches are expensive and a separate broach is required for each size of gear, this method is suitable mainly for high-quality production

== Gear generation ==
In gear generation, the tooth flanks are obtained as an outline of the subsequent positions of the cutter, which resembles in shape the mating gear in the gear pair. There are two machining processes employed shaping and milling. There are several modifications of these processes for different cutting tool used.

Gear hobbing: Gear hobbing is a machining process in which gear teeth are progressively generated by a series of cuts with a helical cutting tool. All motions in hobbing are rotary, and the hob and gear blank rotate continuously as in two gears meshing until all teeth are cut.

== Finishing operations ==
As produced by any of the process described, the surface finish and dimensional accuracy may not be accurate enough for certain applications. Several finishing operations are available, including the conventional process of shaving, and a number of abrasive operations, including grinding, honing, and lapping.

=== Gear failures and mistakes ===
Even with current technologies, gears are still susceptible to errors during production. There are issues with misaligning the installations, wearing down the teeth on a gear from the lack of lubrication, corrosion, and added stress that can be put to damage gears.

== Modern advancements ==
Developing technology has allowed for progression in the production of gears ranging from prototyping to quality control. 3D printing has been used as early as the 1980s for printing and manufacturing gears. This allows for rapid prototyping and also the production of smaller-scale productions. Advancements in gear designs and quality detection have improved with the integration of Artificial Intelligence. Artificial Intelligence has been used for refining control systems, allowing for fewer mistakes to be made. The use of robotics and CNC technology has contributed to furthering production by increasing speed while maintaining precision. The use of robotics leads to lower production costs and higher mass production.

=== Environmental impact ===
Gear manufacturing has an environmental footprint due to waste product and supply usage. There have been advancements made to be more sustainable such as:

- Biodegradable materials
- Recycling plastics
- Utilizing renewable energy sources to power manufacturing plants
- Companies using low-emission production techniques
- Powder metallurgy recycling metal powders

== See also ==
- American Gear Manufacturers Association, standards organization for gears
- International Organization for Standardization (ISO), worldwide federation of standards to ensure quality, safety, and efficiency
