= Harley-Davidson Motorcycle Factory Building =

Original Harley-Davidson motorcycle factory

Coordinates: 43°02′46″N 87°57′36″W

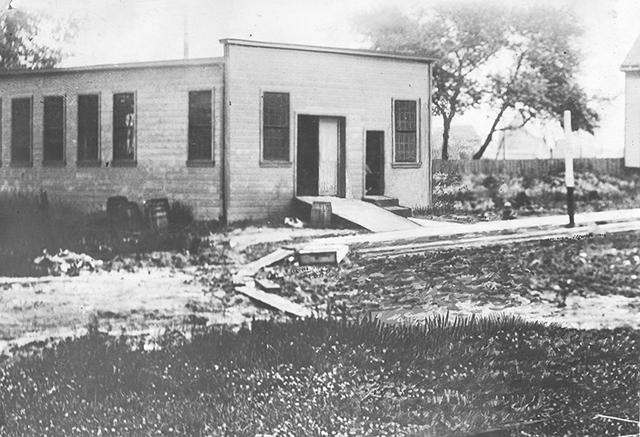
1906 Harley-Davidson Motorcycle Factory Building

The Harley-Davidson Motorcycle Factory Building was the original Harley-Davidson motorcycle factory constructed in Milwaukee, Wisconsin, in 1906. The factory was located at what is now 3700 W. Juneau and it was regularly expanded with additions in the early 1900s. It was added to National Register of Historic Places on November 9, 1994.

== Background ==
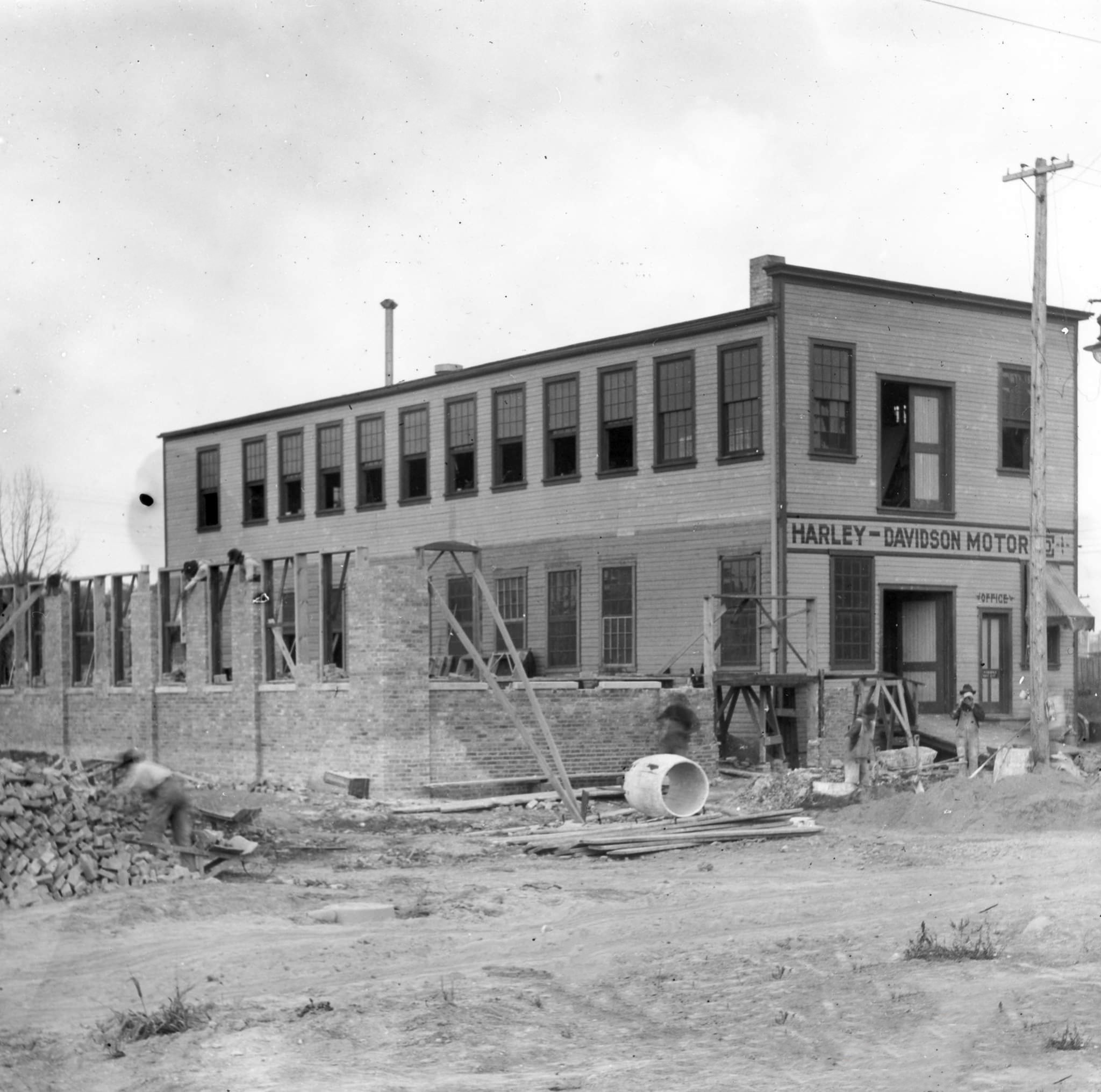
Harley-Davidson Motorcycle Factory Building expansion 1906

Harley-Davidson's first location was a backyard shed where William S. Harley and Arthur Davidson built three motorcycles in 1903. Arthur Davidson's father was a cabinet maker and he constructed the shed in the Davidson backyard: it was 10 ft × 15 ft (3.0 m × 4.6 m). In 1904 the shed size was doubled with an addition and the fledgling company produced 8 motorcycles. In 1905 the shed size was doubled again with another addition. By the end of 1905 Harley and Davidson applied for and received a loan to build a factory. They purchased land at what is now Juneau Avenue in Milwaukee, Wisconsin, and began constructing the 1906 Harley-Davidson Motorcycle Factory Building. In 1906, Harley and the Davidson brothers built their first factory on Chestnut Street (later Juneau Avenue). The first Juneau Avenue plant was 28 ft × 80 ft (8.5 m × 24.4 m).

== Design ==
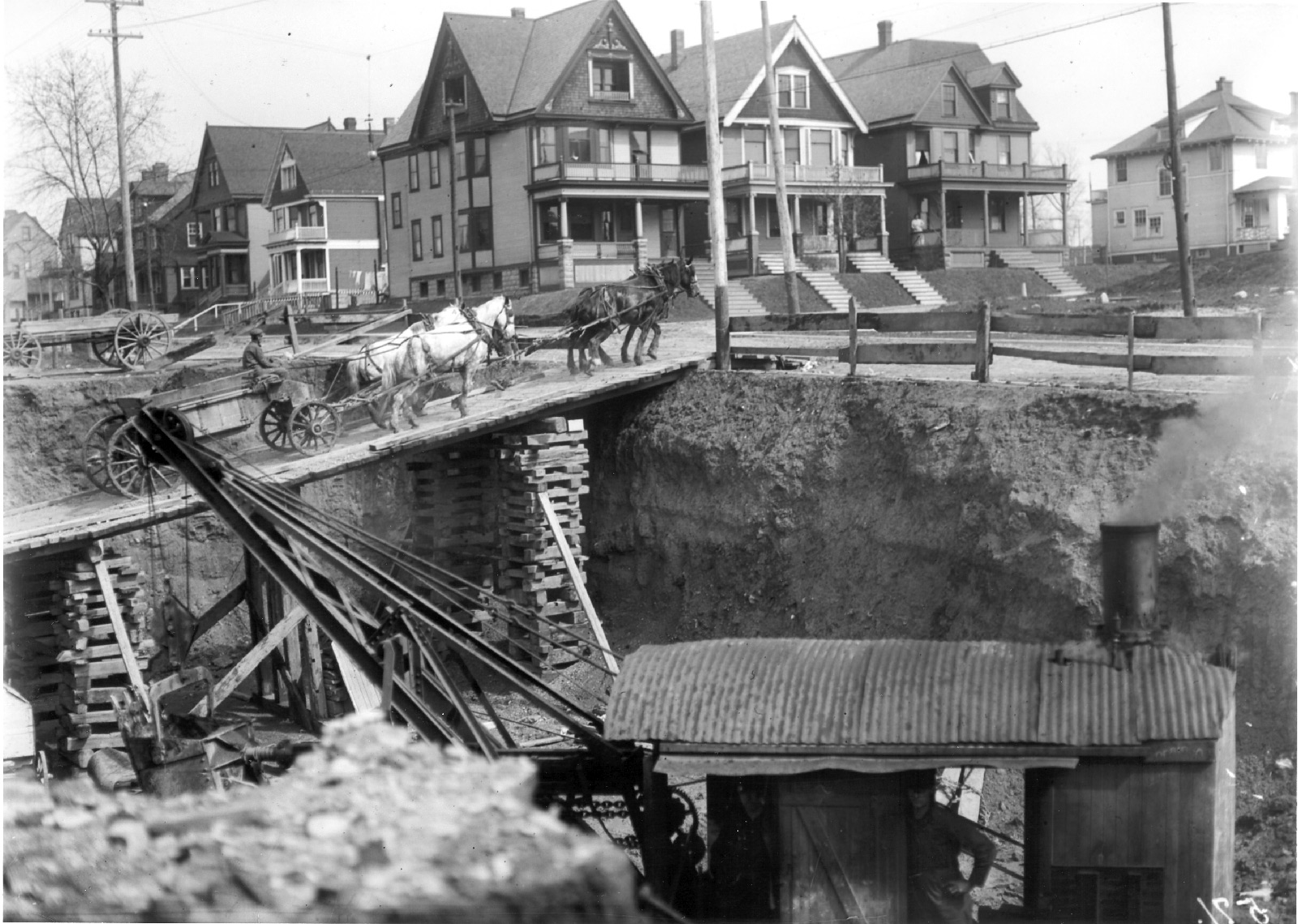
1912 Harley-Davidson Motorcycle Factory Building construction for building addition

The original factory was at the current location of Harley-Davidson's corporate headquarters. In 1906 the company produced 50 machines in their new factory.

The building was continually expanded to meet the demand with construction occurring often. The company also rented factory space in other Milwaukee locations. The demand for Harley-Davidson motorcycles was growing each year: In 1909 they produced 1,149, motorcycles, in 1911 5,625, in 1912 3,852, in 1913 12,966. Motorcycles were produced at the original location from 1903 to 1973.

By 1909 the machine shop occupied 5,760 sq ft (535 m^{2}). The building was considered modern in 1909 but by 1913 it was inadequate based on the increased demand for Harley-Davidsons. The company razed the structure from April 17 to 23, 1913, and began building a larger factory which would be open by June 1913. In 1913 Motorcycle Illustrated published an article on Harley-Davidson constructing their 8th building on the property. It was a 6-story structure with 40,320 sq ft (3,746 m^{2}) of floor space designated for the machine shop and the building was 90 ft × 64 ft (27 m × 20 m). The structure was built at a cost of US$100,000.

The original 1906 Harley-Davidson Motorcycle Factory Building site was added to the Wisconsin Historical Society Register of Historic Places on January 1, 1989, and added to the National Register of Historic Places on November 9, 1994.

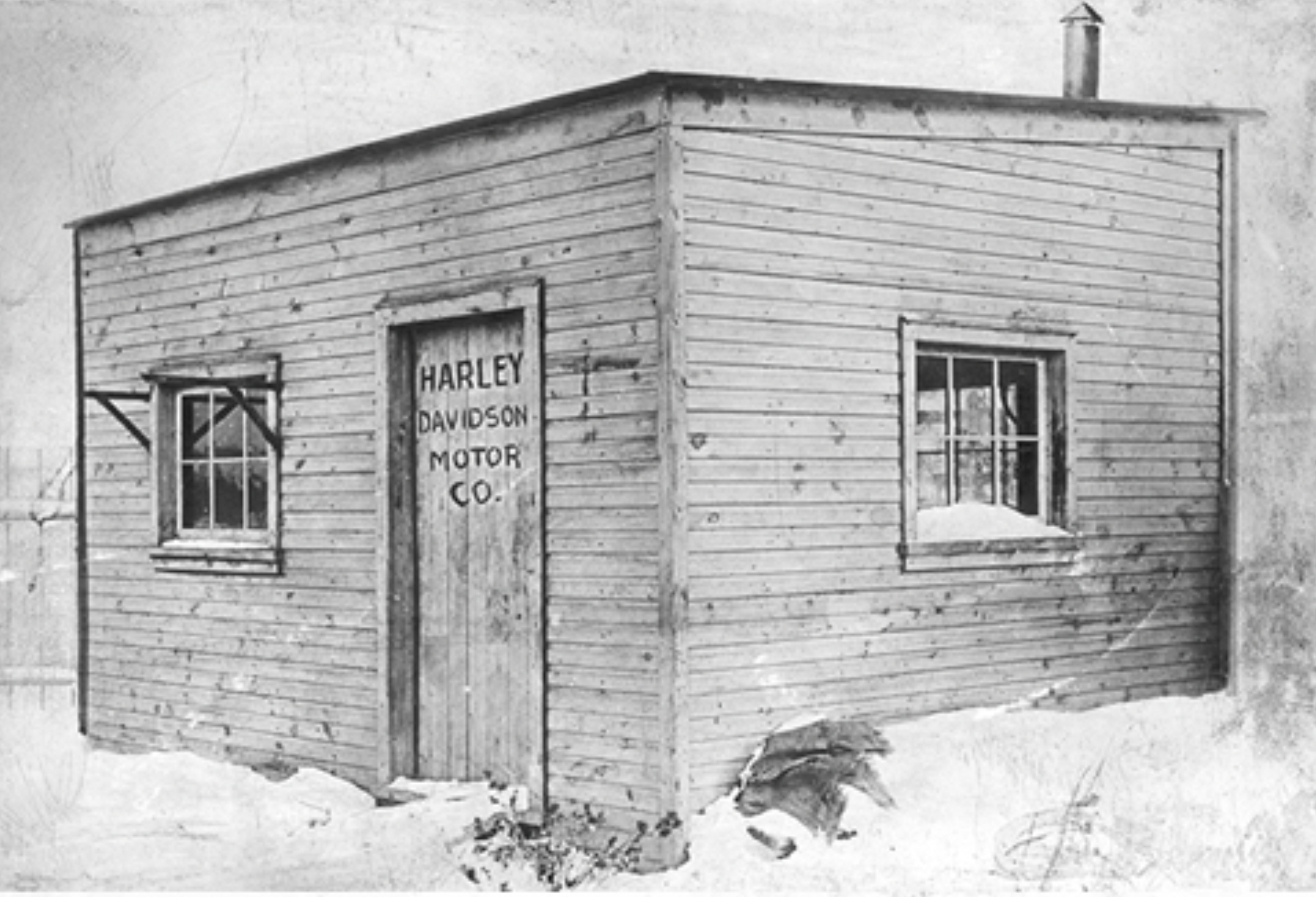
The original 1903 Harley-Davidson motorcycle factory

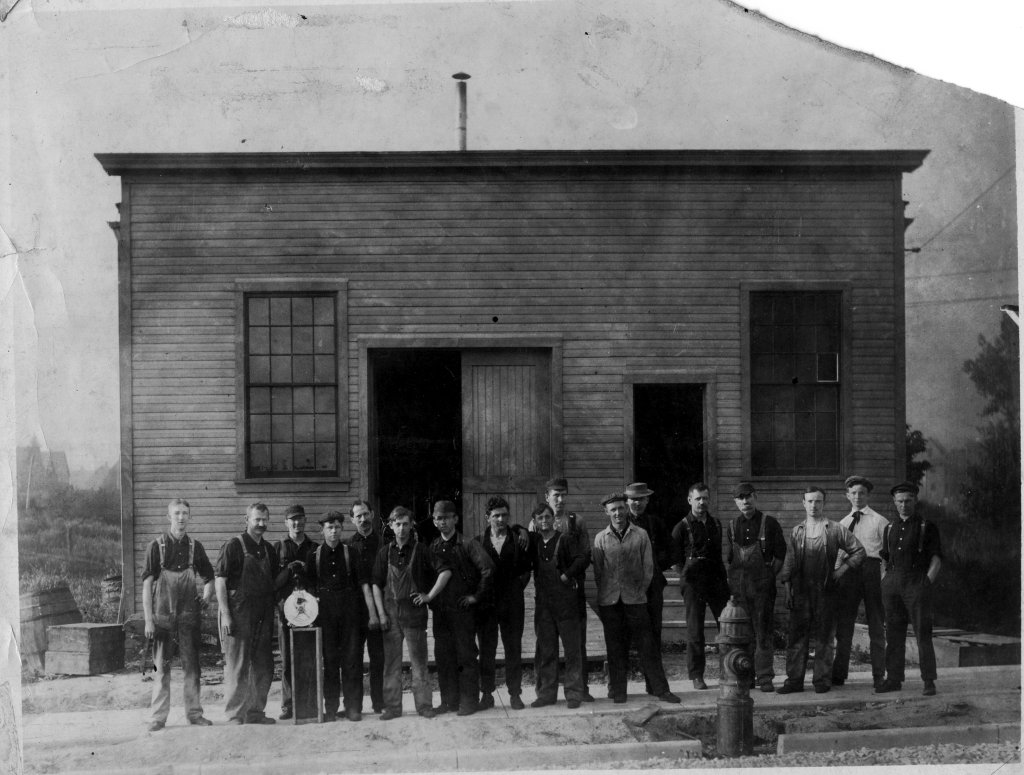
Harley-Davidson Motorcycle Factory Building with entire staff 1907

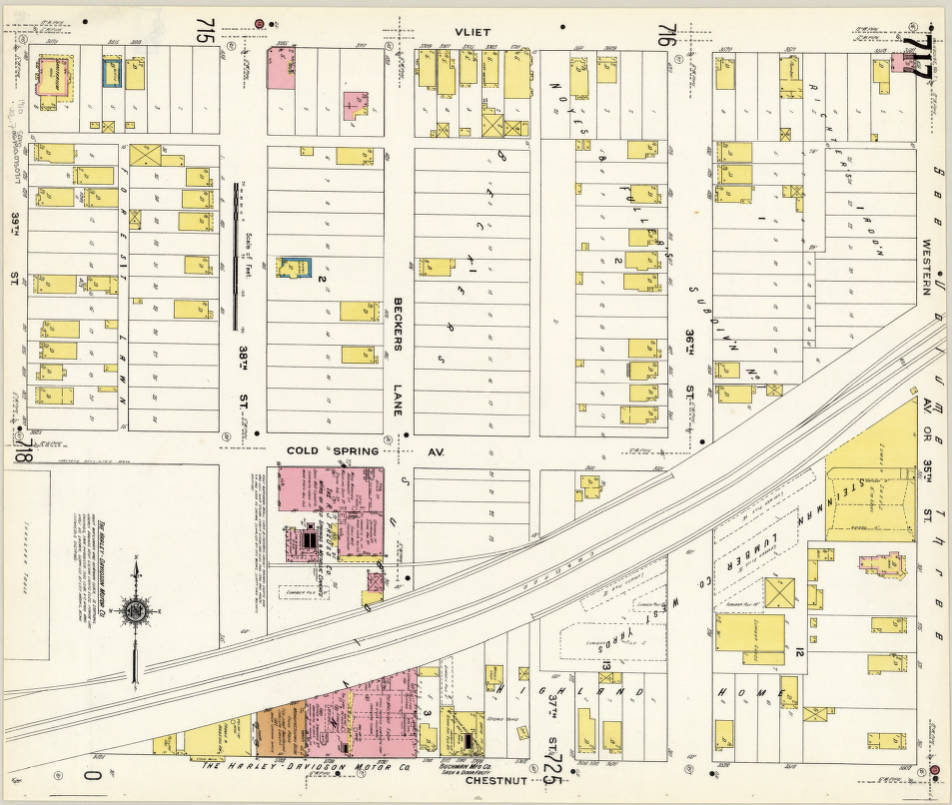
1910 Sanborn map showing the Harley Davidson factory

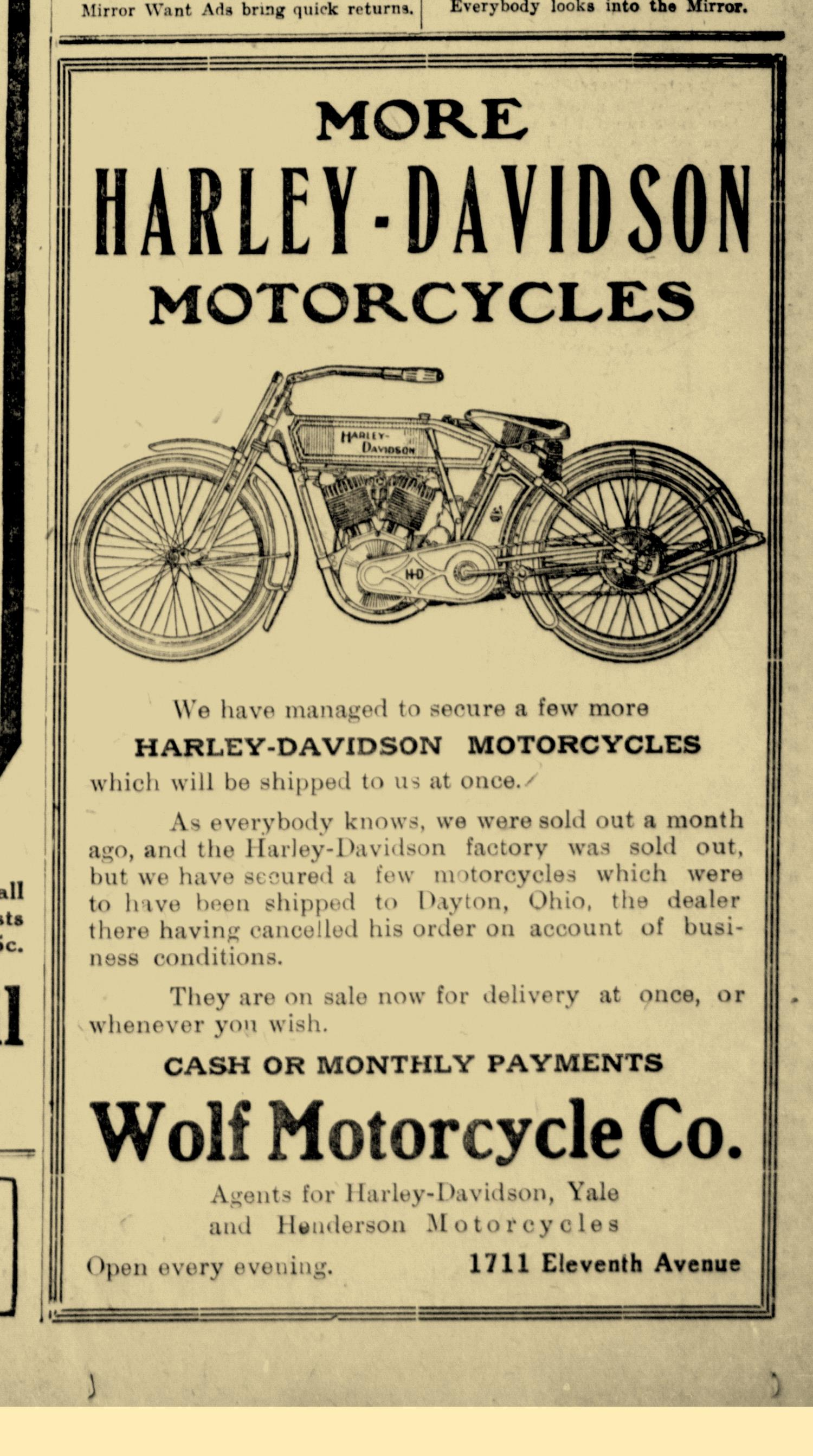
Harley-Davidson ad Altoona-Mirror Apr 15, 1913

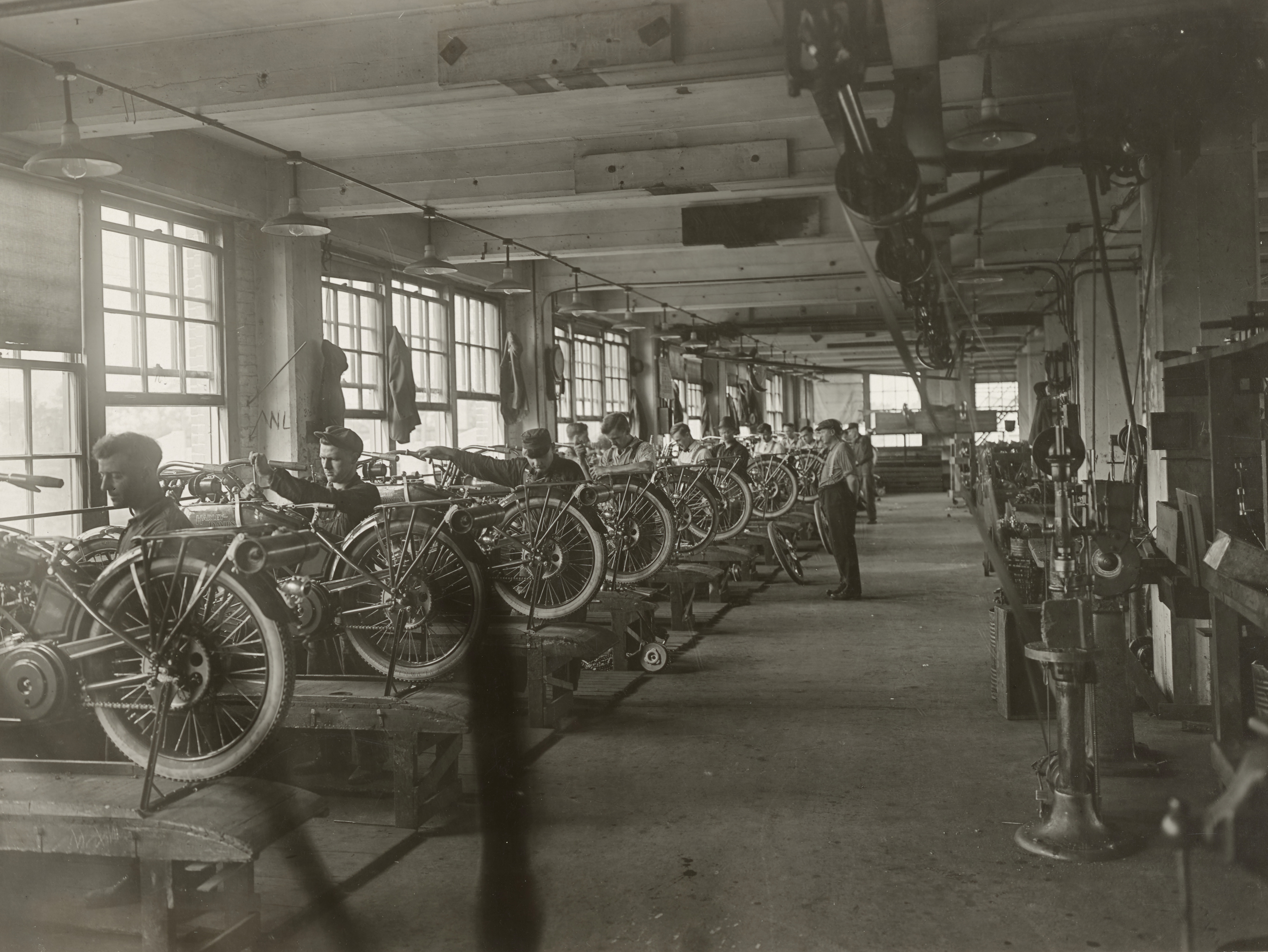
Assembly room 1917

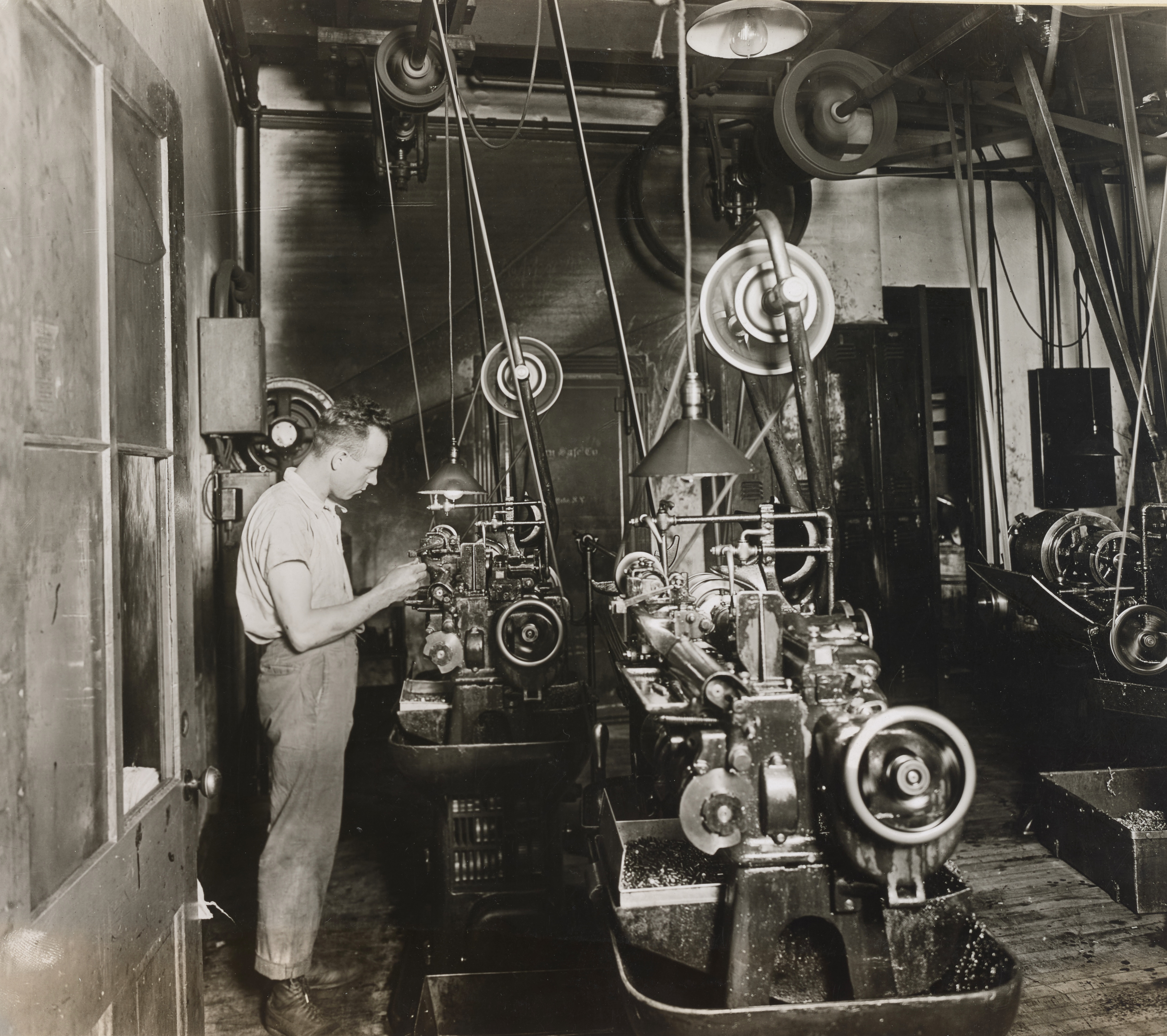
1917 making roller bearings

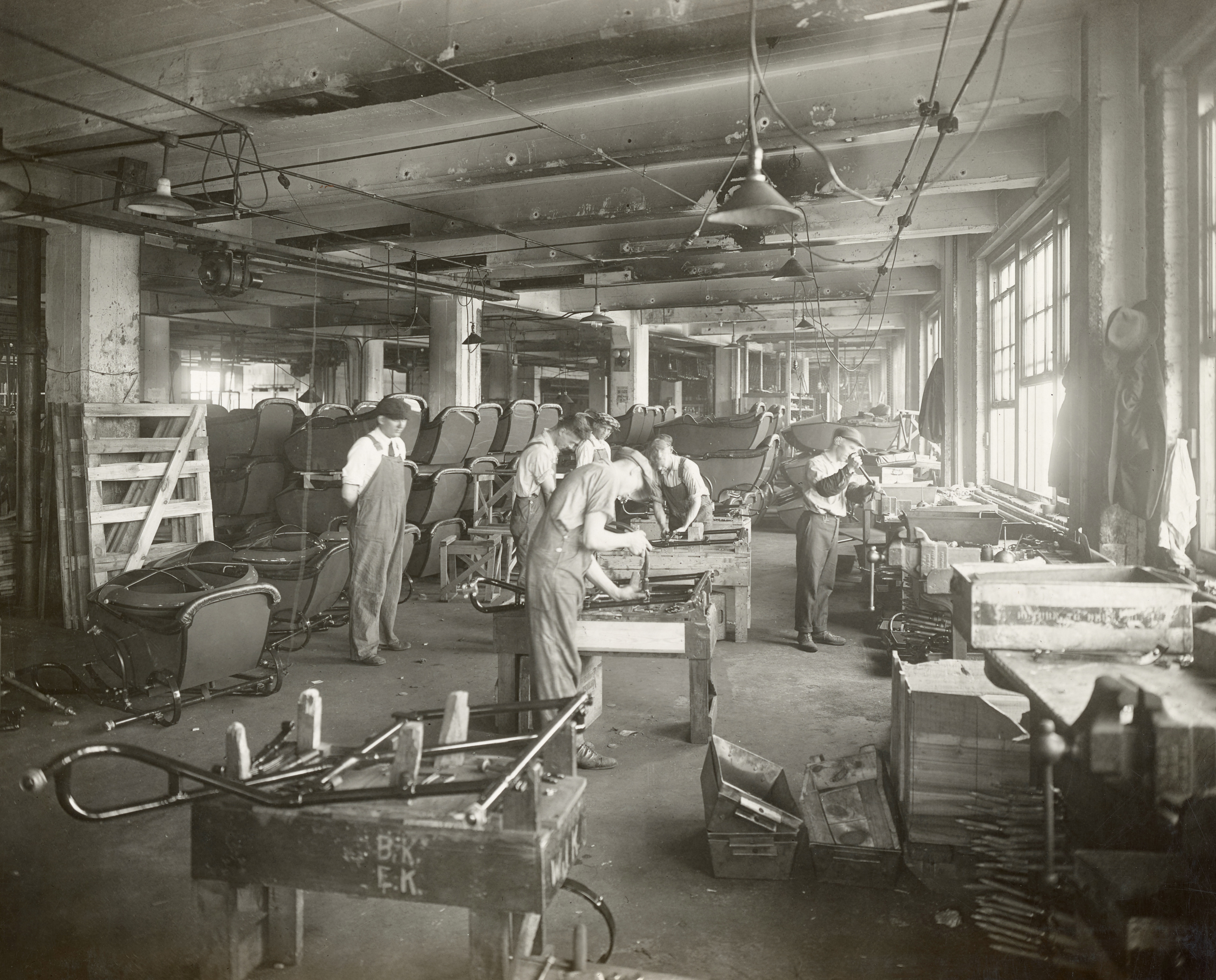
1917 Harley-Davidson sidecars

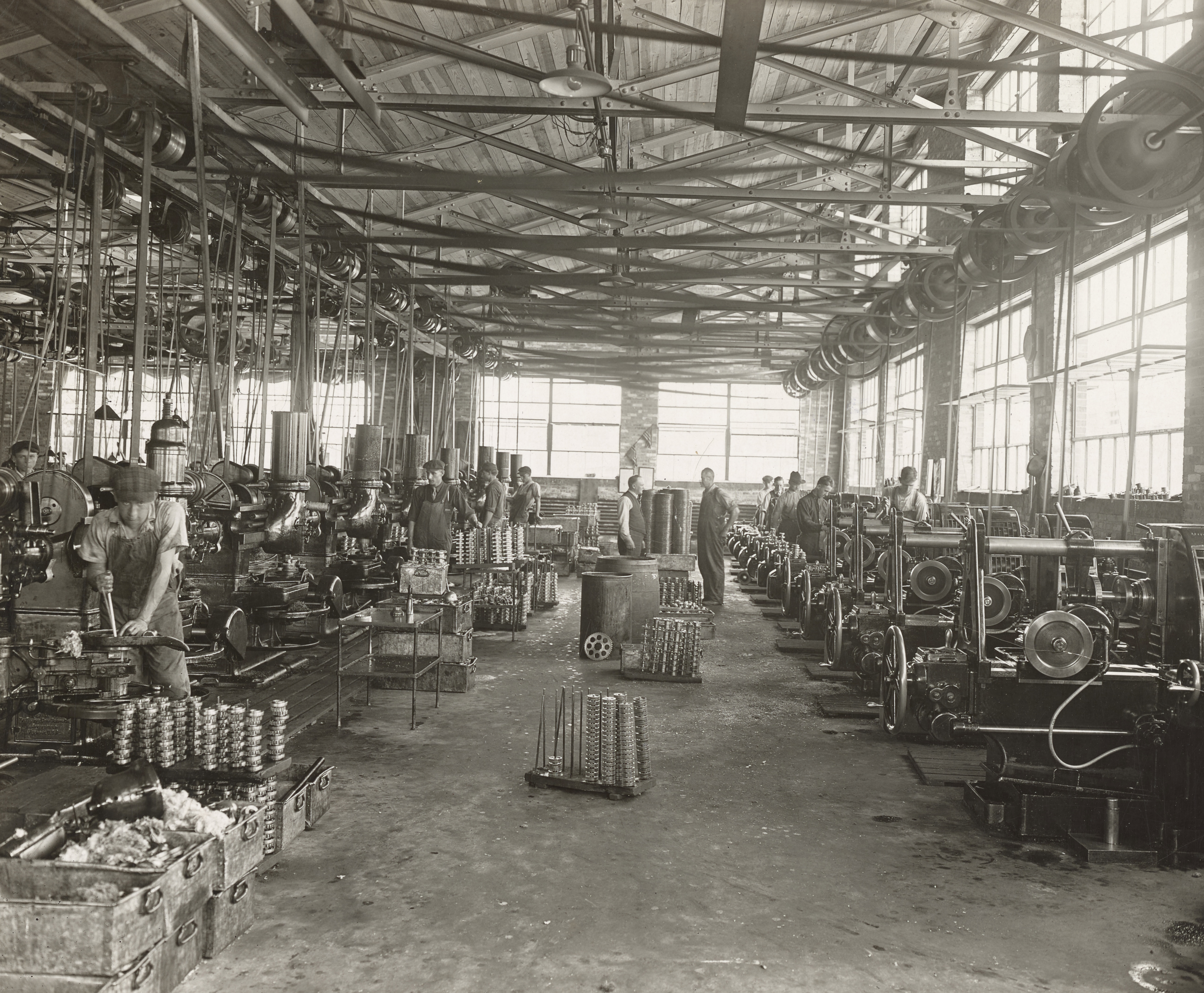
Gear shapers and gear hobbers working on transmission parts. In the plant of Harley Davidson Motor Co 1918

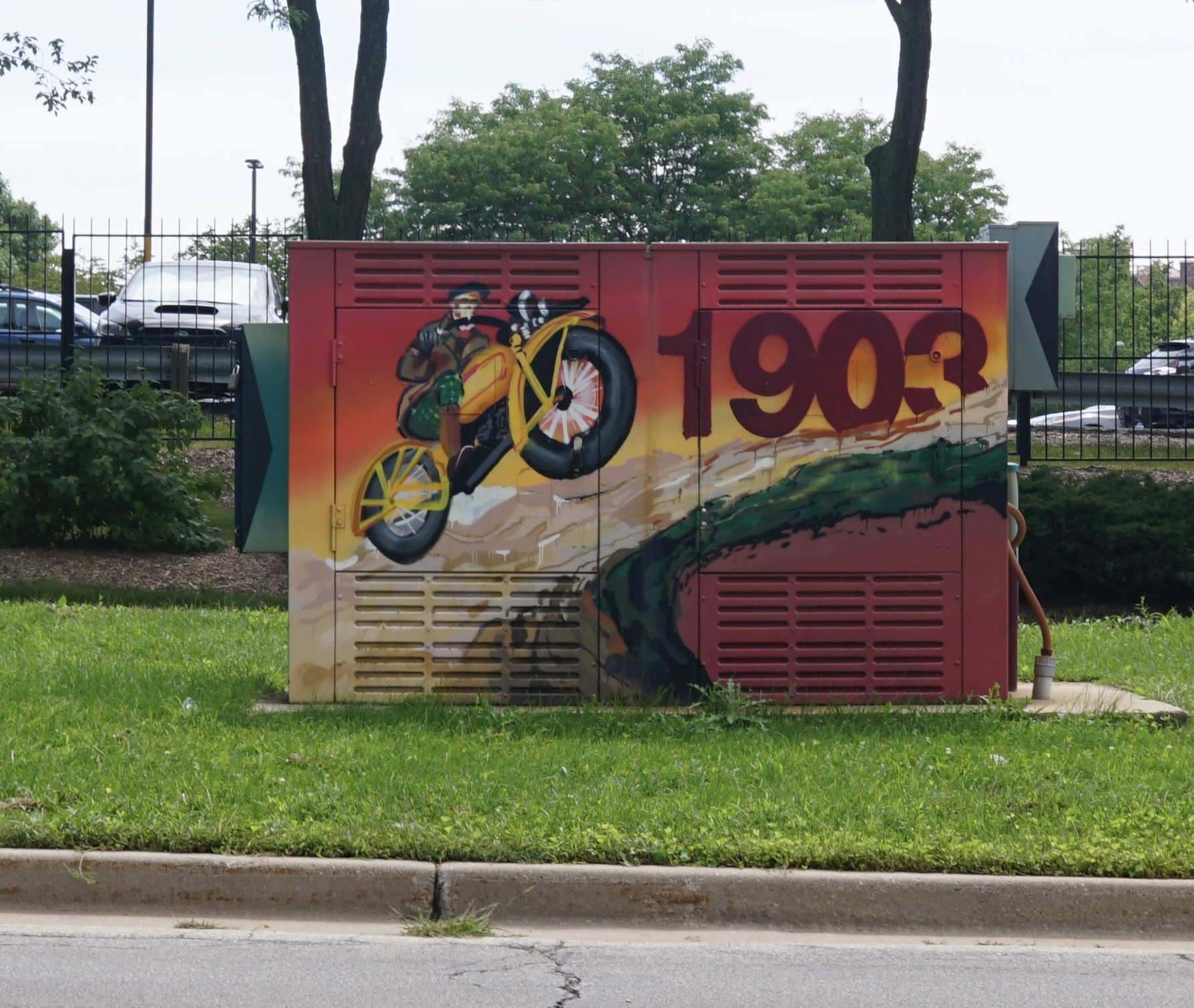
Harley-Davidson Motorcycle Factory Building electrical box with 1903 date

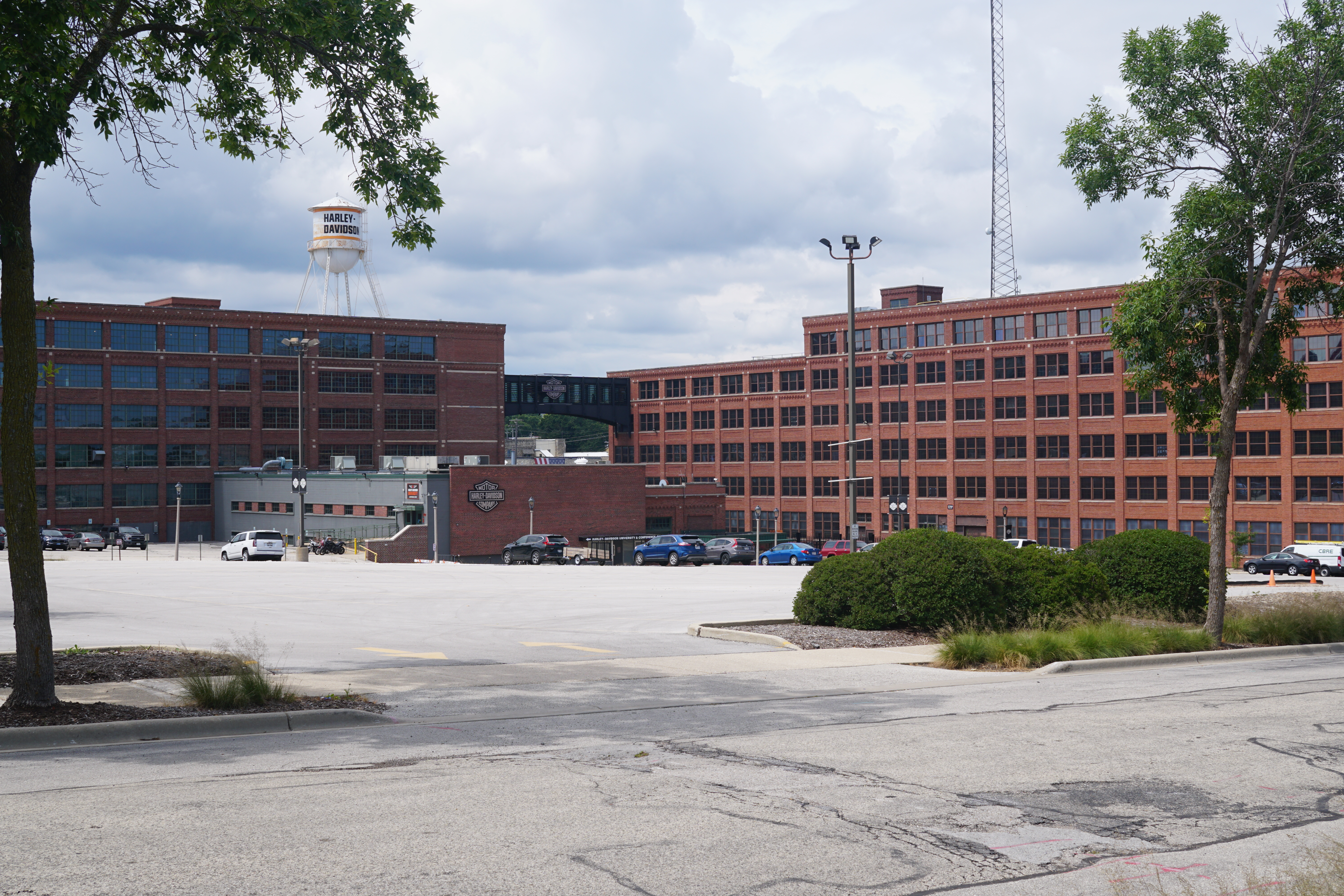
Harley-Davidson Motorcycle Factory Building - now Harley-Davidson offices
