= Burnishing =

Burnishing may refer to:

- Burnishing (metal), plastic deformation of a surface due to sliding contact with another object
- Burnishing (pottery), pottery polishing treatment
