= Skiving (metalworking) =

Used to cut metal in slices

Skiving or scarfing is the process of cutting material off in slices, usually metal, but also leather or laminates. Skiving can be used instead of rolling the material to shape when the material must not be work hardened, or must not shed minute slivers of metal later which is common in cold rolling processes. It can also be used to create fins on a block of metal, not shaving the part entirely off.

In metalworking, skiving can be used to remove a thin dimension of material or to create thin slices in an existing material, such as heat sinks where a large amount of surface area is required relative to the volume of the piece of metal.

The process involves moving the material past precision-profiled tools made to an exact shape, or past plain cutting tools. The tools are typically made of tungsten carbide-based compounds. It requires a minimum material feed rate to cut successfully. At speeds below those of metal planing or about 10 meters/minute (33 feet/minute), the skiving tools can be vibrated at high frequency to increase the relative speed between the tool and workpiece.

In early machines, it was necessary to precisely position the strip relative to the cutting tools, but newer machines use a floating suspension technology which enables tools to locate by material contact. This allows mutual initial positioning differences up to approximately 12 mm (0.47 in) followed by resilient automatic engagement.

Products using this technology directly are automotive seatbelt springs, large power transformer winding strips, rotogravure plates, cable and hose clamps, gas tank straps, and window counterbalance springs. Products using the process indirectly are tubes and pipes where the edge of the strip is accurately beveled prior to being folded into tubular form and seam welded. The beveled edges enable pinhole free welds.

Another metal skiving application is for hydraulic cylinders, where a round and smooth cylinder bore is required for proper actuation. Several skiving knives on a round tool pass through a bore to create a perfectly round hole. Often, a second operation of roller burnishing follows to cold-work the surface to a mirror finish. This process is common among manufacturers of hydraulic and pneumatic cylinders. Compared to honing, skiving and roller burnishing is faster.

Skiving can be applied to gear cutting, where internal gears are skived with a rotary cutter (rather than shaped or broached) in a process analogous to the hobbing of external gears.

== Heat sinks ==
Skiving machine producing copper heat sink fins.

Skiving is also used for the manufacturing of heat sinks for PC cooling products. A PC cooler created by skiving has the benefit that the heat sink base and fins are created from a single piece of material (copper or aluminum), providing improved heat dissipation and heat transfer from base to fins. Additionally, the skiving process also increases the roughness of the fins. Unlike the underside of a heat sink, which needs to be smooth for maximum contact area with the heat source, the fins benefit from this roughness because it increases the fins' surface area on which to dissipate heat into the air. The fins may be made much thinner and closer together than by extrusion or formed sheet processes, which can offer greater heat transfer in high-performance waterblocks for water cooling.

== See also ==
- Skiving (leathercraft)
