= Crankshaft deep rolling =

Deep rolling is a method of cold work deformation and burnishing of internal combustion engine crankshaft journal fillets to increase durability and design safety factors. Compressive residual stresses can be measured below the surface of a deep-rolled fillet. Other types of fillets on shafts or tubes can also benefit from this method. Cast iron crankshafts will experience the most improvement potentially doubling their fatigue life. Typically the crankshaft is machined with under-cut fillets as opposed to tangential radiused for ease of manufacture, although all types can be deep-rolled. Most automakers are currently utilizing this crankshaft technology including: General Motors LLC, Ford Motor Company, and Fiat Chrysler Automobiles (FCA). Ingersoll USA, LLC of Midland, Michigan with Global HQ located in Farmington Hills MI, The North American-based Hegenscheidt-MFD Corporation in Sterling Heights, MI, was established in 1966.China and European based SPMS in Évry, France (established 1974), are the only major machine/tooling manufacturers of this application in Europe and North America, supplying a highly specialized product throughout the global manufacturing sectors.

== See also ==
- Roller burnishing
