= Roller burnishing =

Process used to obtain mirror finishes inside metal holes

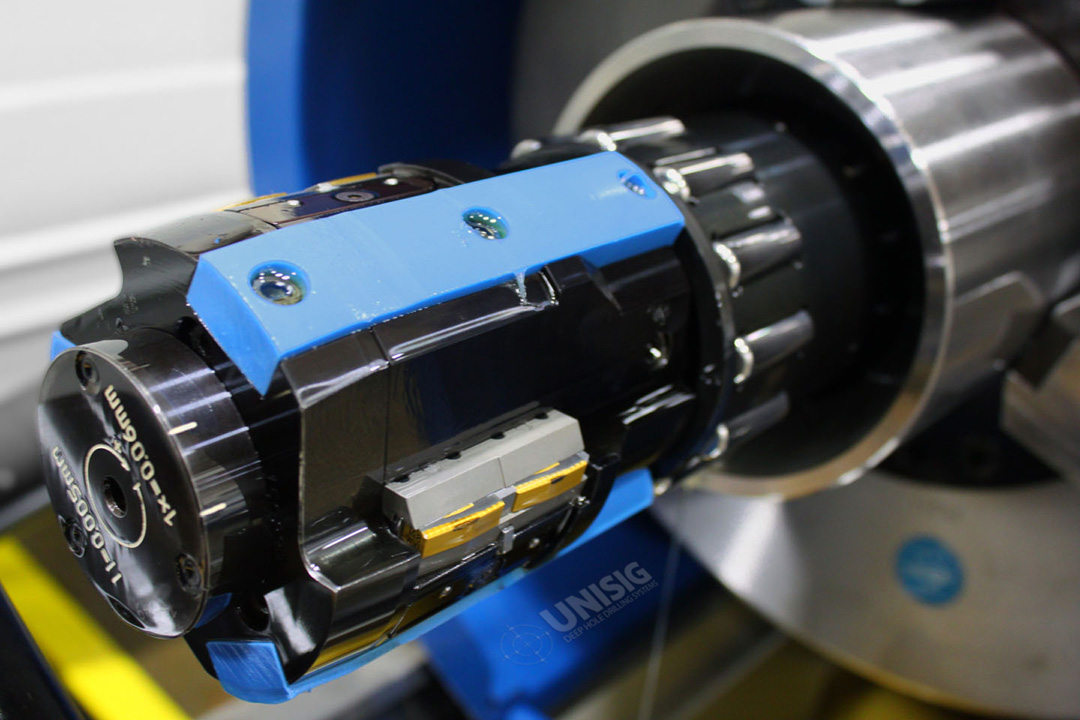
A skive-burnishing tool is used to achieve mirror surface finish in hydraulic cylinders.

Roller burnishing is a surface finishing technique where hardened rollers cold work surface imperfections to reduce surface roughness. Roller burnishing differs from abrasive surface finishing techniques in that material is displaced rather than removed. The tooling typically consists of a hardened sphere or cylindrical roller. The tooling is pressed into the surface of the part while it is rotated (in some applications, the tools are rotated instead of the part). The burnishing tool rolls against the surface of the part at a constant speed, producing a very consistent finish across the part. A surface finish of less than Ra 0.1 μm is achievable with roller burnishing. A side effect is that the outer surface of the part is work hardened.

== Crankshaft manufacturing ==
Roller burnishing is used in the production of some crankshafts. A dual roller (cylindrical) tool is moved into the thrust bearing journal of a crankshaft, while the crankshaft is spinning the tool is indexed (so each roller is perpendicular to the thrust surface while backing each other up) deforming the surfaces. So the diameters of each roller added together (compensated for elastic deformation) equals the finish dimension of the thrust bearing.

== Skiving machine ==
In deep hole machining, a roller burnishing tool is often combined with skiving knives on the same tool. The skiving knives pass first, scraping the inside layer of metal, followed by the burnishing rollers, which cold work the tube to create a mirror surface finish. Skive-burnishing is often used in hydraulic cylinder applications. This process can happen on a deep hole drilling machine or a dedicated skiving machine.

== See also ==
- Crankshaft deep rolling
- Burnishing (metal)
