= Skiving (leathercraft) =

Thinning of a piece of leather using a sharp tool

Skiving is the process used in leather crafting to reduce the thickness of leather, especially in areas that are to be bent or folded and which must be pliable without becoming weakened. It is usually performed on the "flesh" side of a piece of leather rather than the "finished" (hair) side. Skiving is also used when two edges of leather are to be joined, so as to keep the overlapping area from becoming unnecessarily bulky. The technique is useful for joining long strips of leather together to form belts or watchbands.

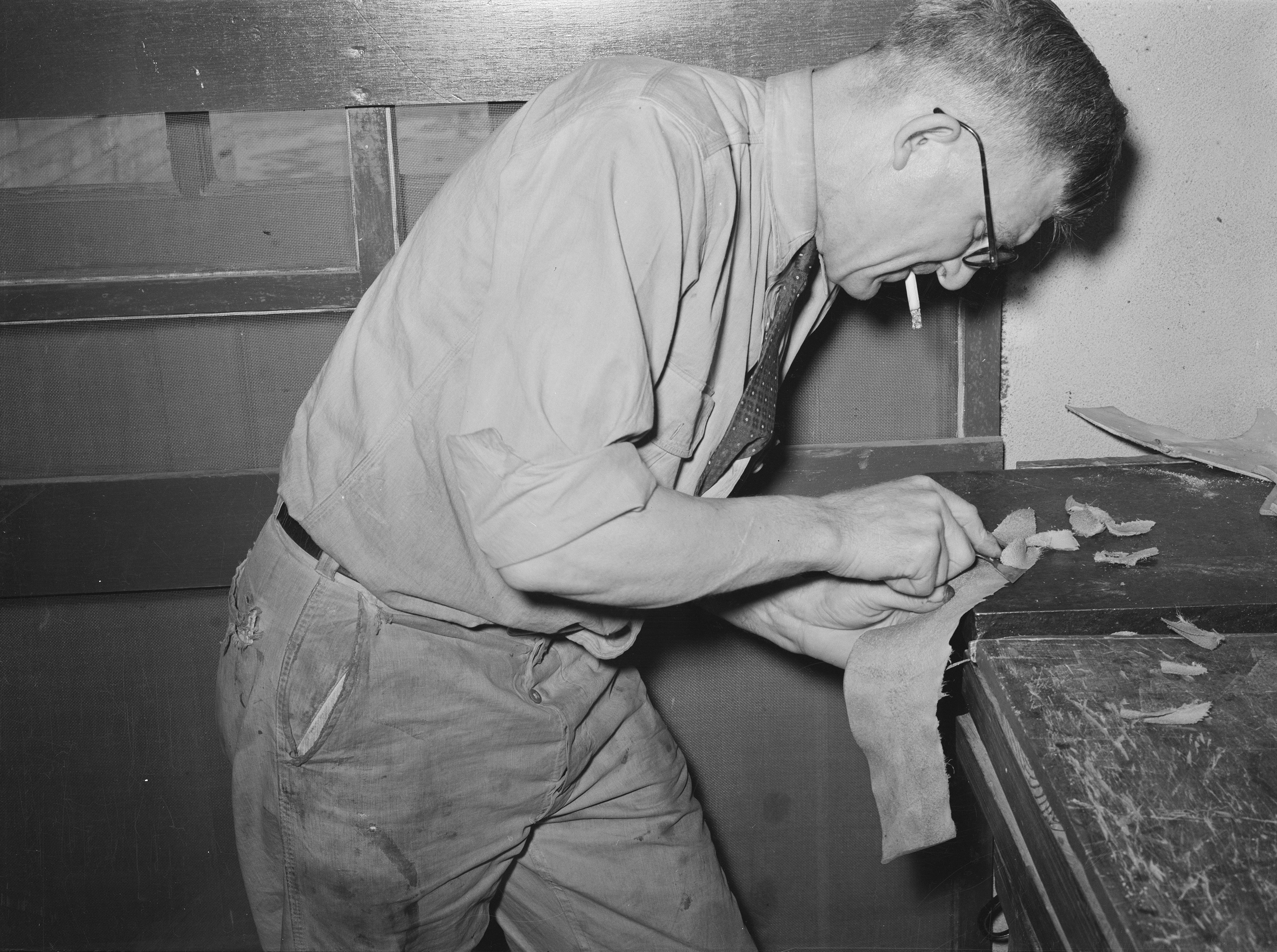
Hand skiving leather in a Texas saddle shop, 1939

== See also ==
- Skiving (metalworking)
