= Gear shaping =

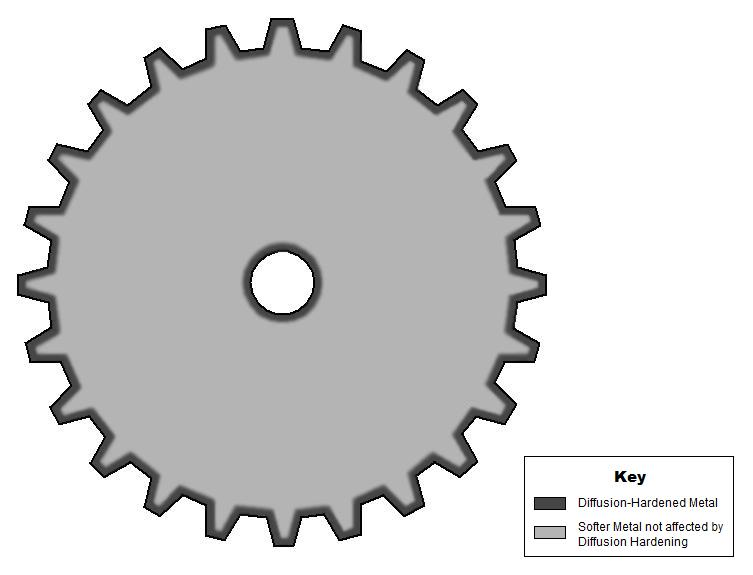
Shaping a gear

Gear shaping is a specific machining process for creating teeth on a gear using a reciprocating cutter. Gear shaping is a convenient and versatile method of gear cutting. It involves continuous, same-plane rotational cutting of gear.

Other methods of gear tooth cutting include Hobbing, Milling and Grinding all of which use rotating tools or cutters to create the gear tooth profile. Electrical discharge machining ortherwise known as wire eroding can also be used to manufacture metal gears.

== Process theory ==
The types of cutters used for gear shaping can be grouped into four categories: disk, hub, shank, and helical cutters. The cutters are essentially gears that are used to form the teeth. This method of gear cutting is based on the principle that any two gears will mesh if they are of the same pitch, proper helix angle, and proper tooth depth and thickness.

== Process characteristics ==
By using a gear-shaped corresponding cutter that is rotated (in relation to a blank gear) produces the gear teeth. The cutters that are rotated are timed with the workpiece. This process produces internal gears, external gears, and integral gear-pinion arrangements.

== Process schematic ==
The process of gear shaping uses a toothed disk cutter which reciprocates in axial rotations. The workpiece (or blank gear) rotates on a second shaft (spindle). The workpiece is aligned with the cutter and it gradually feeds into the cutter while rotating. If a two-step process is used, all tooth spaces are partially cut before finishing.

== Setup and equipment ==
The machine used for gear shaping generally consists of a base, column spindle, and an arbor. The gear cutter is mounted on the spindle, and the gear blank is mounted on the arbor. The cutter reciprocates up and down while the workpiece is gradually fed into the cutter. At the end of each cutting rotation, the spindle is retracted slightly to discourage any more cutting into the new cut teeth of the gear.
