= Burnishing (metal) =

Deformation of a metal surface due to friction

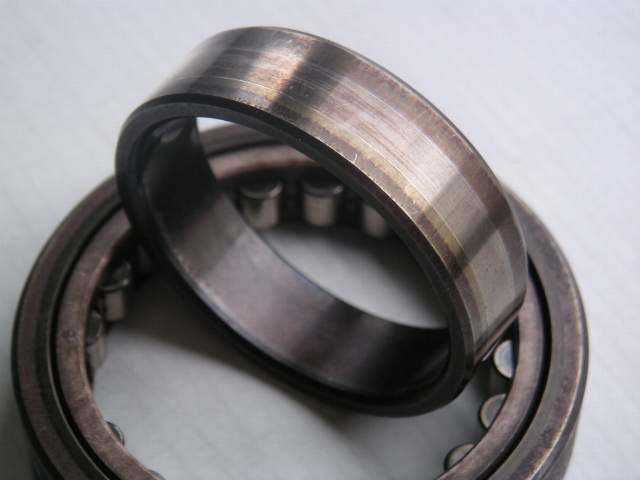
The inner raceway of this roller bearing has been burnished by the bearing's rollers.

Burnishing is the plastic deformation of a surface due to sliding contact with another object. It smooths the surface and makes it shinier. Burnishing may occur on any sliding surface if the contact stress locally exceeds the yield strength of the material. The phenomenon can occur both unintentionally as a failure mode, and intentionally as part of a metalworking or manufacturing process. It is a squeezing operation under cold working.

== Failure mode (unintentionally) ==
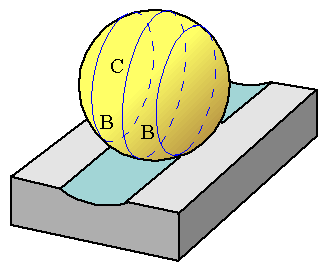
A ball carves a channel through a flat plate.

The action of a hardened ball against a softer, flat plate illustrates the process of burnishing. If the ball is pushed directly into the plate, stresses develop in both objects around the area where they contact. As this normal force increases, both the ball and the plate's surfaces deform.

The deformation caused by the hardened ball increases with the magnitude of the force pressing against it. If the force on it is small, when the force is released both the ball and plate's surface will return to their original, undeformed shape. In that case, the stresses in the plate are always less than the yield strength of the material, so the deformation is purely elastic. Since it was given that the flat plate is softer than the ball, the plate's surface will always deform more.

Elastic deformation (A) and plastic deformation (B)

If a larger force is used, there will also be plastic deformation and the plate's surface will be permanently altered. A bowl-shaped indentation will be left behind, surrounded by a ring of raised material that was displaced by the ball. The stresses between the ball and the plate are described in more detail by Hertzian stress theory.

Dragging the ball across the plate will have a different effect than pressing. In that case, the force on the ball can be decomposed into two component forces: one normal to the plate's surface, pressing it in, and the other tangential, dragging it along. As the tangential component is increased, the ball will start to slide along the plate. At the same time, the normal force will deform both objects, just as with the static situation. If the normal force is low, the ball will rub against the plate but not permanently alter its surface. The rubbing action will create friction and heat, but it will not leave a mark on the plate. However, as the normal force increases, eventually the stresses in the plate's surface will exceed its yield strength. When that happens the ball will plow through the surface and create a trough behind it. The plowing action of the ball is burnishing. Burnishing also occurs when the ball can rotate, as would happen in the above scenario if another flat plate was brought down from above to induce downwards loading, and at the same time to cause rotation and translation of the ball, as in the case of a ball bearing.

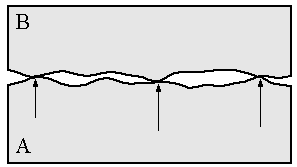
Upon magnification, two flat plates touch only at a few asperities.

Burnishing occurs on surfaces which conform to each other, such as between two flat plates, but it happens on a microscopic scale. Even the smoothest of surfaces will have imperfections if viewed at a high enough magnification. The imperfections that extend above the general form of a surface are called asperities, and they can plow material on another surface just like the ball dragging along the plate. The combined effect of many of these asperities produce the smeared texture that is associated with burnishing.

== Effects on sliding contact ==
Burnishing is normally undesirable in mechanical components for a variety of reasons, sometimes simply because its effects are unpredictable. Even light burnishing will significantly alter the surface finish of a part. Initially the finish will be smoother, but with repetitive sliding action, grooves will develop on the surface along the sliding direction. The plastic deformation associated with burnishing will harden the surface and generate compressive residual stresses. Although these properties are usually advantageous, excessive burnishing leads to sub-surface cracks which cause spalling, a phenomenon where the upper layer of a surface flakes off of the bulk material.

Burnishing may also affect the performance of a machine. The plastic deformation associated with burnishing creates greater heat and friction than from rubbing alone. That reduces the efficiency of the machine and limits its speed. Furthermore, plastic deformation alters the form and geometry of the part reducing the precision and accuracy of the machine. The combination of higher friction and degraded form often leads to a runaway situation which continually worsens until the component fails.

To prevent destructive burnishing, sliding must be avoided, and in rolling situations, loads must be beneath the spalling threshold. In the areas of a machine that slide with respect to each other, roller bearings can be inserted so that the components are in rolling contact instead of sliding. If sliding cannot be avoided, then a lubricant should be added between the components. The purpose of the lubricant in this case is to separate the components with a lubricant film so they cannot contact. The lubricant also distributes the load over a larger area, so that the local contact forces are not as high. If there was already a lubricant, its film thickness must be increased; usually this can be accomplished by increasing the viscosity of the lubricant.

== In manufacturing (intentionally) ==
Burnishing is not always unwanted. If it occurs in a controlled manner, it can have desirable effects. Burnishing processes are used in manufacturing to improve the size, shape, surface finish, or surface hardness of a workpiece. It is essentially a forming operation which occurs on a small scale. The benefits of burnishing often include combating fatigue failure, preventing corrosion and stress corrosion, texturing surfaces to eliminate visual defects, closing porosity, and creating surface compressive residual stress.

There are several forms of burnishing processes, the most common are roller burnishing and ball burnishing (a subset of which is also referred to as ballizing). In both cases, a burnishing tool runs against the workpiece and plastically deforms its surface. In some instances of the latter case (and always in ballizing), it rubs, in the former it generally rotates and rolls. The workpiece may be at ambient temperature, or heated to reduce the forces and wear on the tool. The tool is usually hardened and coated with special materials to increase its life.

Ball burnishing, or ballizing, is a replacement for other bore finishing operations including grinding, honing, or polishing. A ballizing tool consists of one or more over-sized balls that are pushed through a hole. The tool is similar to a broach, but instead of cutting away material, it plows it out of the way. Ball burnishing is also used as a deburring operation. It is especially useful for removing the burr in the middle of a through hole that was drilled from both sides.

Ball burnishing tools of another type are sometimes used in CNC milling centers to follow a ball-nosed milling operation: the hardened ball is applied along a zig-zag toolpath in a holder similar to a ball-point pen, except that the 'ink' is pressurized, recycled lubricant. That combines the productivity of a machined finish which is achieved by a 'semi-finishing' cut, with a better finish than obtainable with slow and time-consuming finish cuts. The feed rate for burnishing is that associated with 'rapid traverse' rather than finish machining.

Roller burnishing or surface rolling, is used on cylindrical, conical, or disk shaped workpieces. The tool resembles a roller bearing, but the rollers are generally very slightly tapered so that their envelope diameter can be accurately adjusted. The rollers typically rotate within a cage, as in a roller bearing. Typical applications for roller burnishing include hydraulic system components, shaft fillets, and sealing surfaces. Very close control of size can be exercised.

Burnishing also occurs to some extent in machining processes. In turning, burnishing occurs if the cutting tool is not sharp, if a large negative rake angle is used, if a very small depth of cut is used, or if the workpiece material is gummy. As a cutting tool wears, it becomes more blunt and the burnishing effect becomes more pronounced. In grinding, since the abrasive grains are randomly oriented and some are not sharp, there is always some amount of burnishing. That is a reason the grinding is less efficient and generates more heat than turning. In drilling, burnishing occurs with drills that have lands to burnish the material as it drills into it. Regular twist drills or straight fluted drills have 2 lands to guide them through the hole. There are 4 or more lands on burnishing drills similar to reamers.

Burnish setting, also known as flush, gypsy, or shot setting is a setting technique used in stonesetting. A space is drilled, into which a stone is inserted such that the girdle of the stone, the point of maximum diameter, is just below the surface of the metal. A burnishing tool is used to push metal all around the stone to hold the stone and give a flush appearance, with a burnished edge around it. This type of setting has a long history but is gaining a resurgence in contemporary jewelry.

== See also ==
- Low plasticity burnishing
