= Gear shaper =

Machine used to create teeth on gears

A gear shaper is a machine tool for cutting the teeth of internal or external gears, it is a specialised application of the more general shaper machine. The name shaper relates to the fact that the cutter engages the part on the forward stroke and pulls away from the part on the return stroke, just like the clapper box on a planer shaper.

The cutting tool is also gear shaped having the same pitch as the gear to be cut. However number of cutting teeth must be less than that of the gear to be cut for internal gears. For external gears the number of teeth on the cutter is limited only by the size of the shaping machine.

The principal motions involved in rotary gear shaper cutting are of the following :

1. Cutting Stroke: The downward linear motion of the cutter spindle together with the cutter .
2. Return Stroke: The upward linear travel of the spindle and cutter to withdraw the cutter to its starting position.
3. Indexing Motion: Slow speed continuous rotation of the cutter spindle and work spindle to provide circular feed, the two speeds being regulated through the change gears such that against each rotation of the cutter the gear blank revolves through n/N revolution, where "n" is the number of teeth of the cutter, and "N" is the number of teeth to be cut on the blank.
4. Completion of Cutting Operation: The indexing and reciprocating motions continue until the required number of teeth to the required depth are cut all along the periphery of the gear blank.

== See also ==
- Hobbing
- Milling (machining)
