= Haas Automation =

American machine tool builder

Haas Automation, Inc.
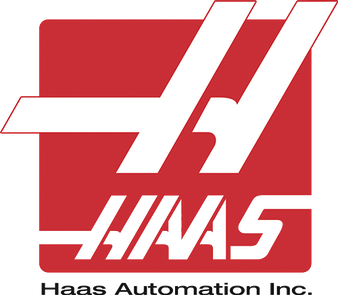
- Type: Private
- Industry: CNC Machine Tools, Manufacturing
- Founded: 1983; 43 years ago
- Founder: Gene Haas
- Headquarters: Oxnard, California, U.S.
- Number of locations: Oxnard, California: Corporate headquarters and manufacturing facility; Brussels, Belgium: Regional headquarters; Shanghai, China: Regional headquarters; Mumbai, India: Regional headquarters
- Area served: Worldwide
- Products: CNC vertical machining centers; CNC horizontal machining centers; CNC lathes/turning centers; CNC rotary products and indexers; 5-axis machining centers; Mold making machining centers; Toolroom machines; Gantry routers
- Revenue: >$1 billion (2018)
- Owner: Gene Haas
- Number of employees: 1,300 (Oxnard HQ, 2018)
- Subsidiaries: Haas CNC Racing; Haas F1 Team; Haas Factory Team; Stewart–Haas Racing
- Website: www.HaasCNC.com

Haas Automation, Inc is an American machine tool builder headquartered in Oxnard, California. The company designs and manufactures lower cost machine tools and specialized accessory tooling, mostly computer numerically controlled (CNC) equipment, such as vertical machining centers and horizontal machining centers, lathes/turning centers, and rotary tables and indexers. Most of its products are manufactured at the company's main facility in Oxnard. The company is also involved in motorsports: it owns the Haas F1 Team and the Haas Factory Team in NASCAR, and was formerly a co-owner of NASCAR team Stewart–Haas Racing. Haas is one of the largest machine tool builders in the world by total unit volume.

== History ==
Gene Haas founded Haas Automation in 1983 in Sun Valley, California, to manufacture machine tool accessory tooling and rotary tables. The company entered the machine tool industry with the first fully automatic, programmable collet indexer. Over the next four years, the company expanded its product line to include fully programmable rotary tables, rotary indexers, and other machine tool accessories.

In 1987, Haas Automation began developing its first vertical machining center (VMC), the VF-1, a machine designed to perform operations such as milling, drilling, tapping, and boring. The first VF-1 prototypes were completed in 1988, and introduced at the International Manufacturing Technology Show (IMTS '88) in Chicago, Illinois. The company moved to larger facilities in Chatsworth, Los Angeles, in 1991, but Haas was dissatisfied with the local government and the building permit process. In 1997, Haas moved to a purpose-built facility on 86 acres (35 ha) in Oxnard.

In 2019, Haas purchased 279 acres (113 ha) of land in Henderson, Nevada, for $27.4 million to expand its business, planning to build 4.3 million square feet of commercial space with 2.3 million square feet intended for a $327 million manufacturing facility

During the Russian invasion of Ukraine, Haas Automation was accused by the Economic Security Council of Ukraine in March 2023 of violating United States sanctions by supplying the Russian arms industry with CNC machines via Abamet Management, which distributes parts in Russia and Belarus and with whom Haas severed ties in March 2022. The company denied the allegations and asserted it had departed Russia prior to the invasion, while remaining Haas equipment were taken over by an independent distributor. In August, a follow-up investigation by the ESCU suggested Haas was still indirectly providing resources to the Russian military through Suzhou Sup Bestech Machine Tools Co, a Chinese liaison that was founded two weeks after Haas formally ended operations in Russia. Haas was fined $1.04 million by the United States Treasury Department's Office of Foreign Assets Control in January 2025 for "21 apparent violations of sanctions related to the defense and energy sectors of the Russian Federation economy."

== Products ==
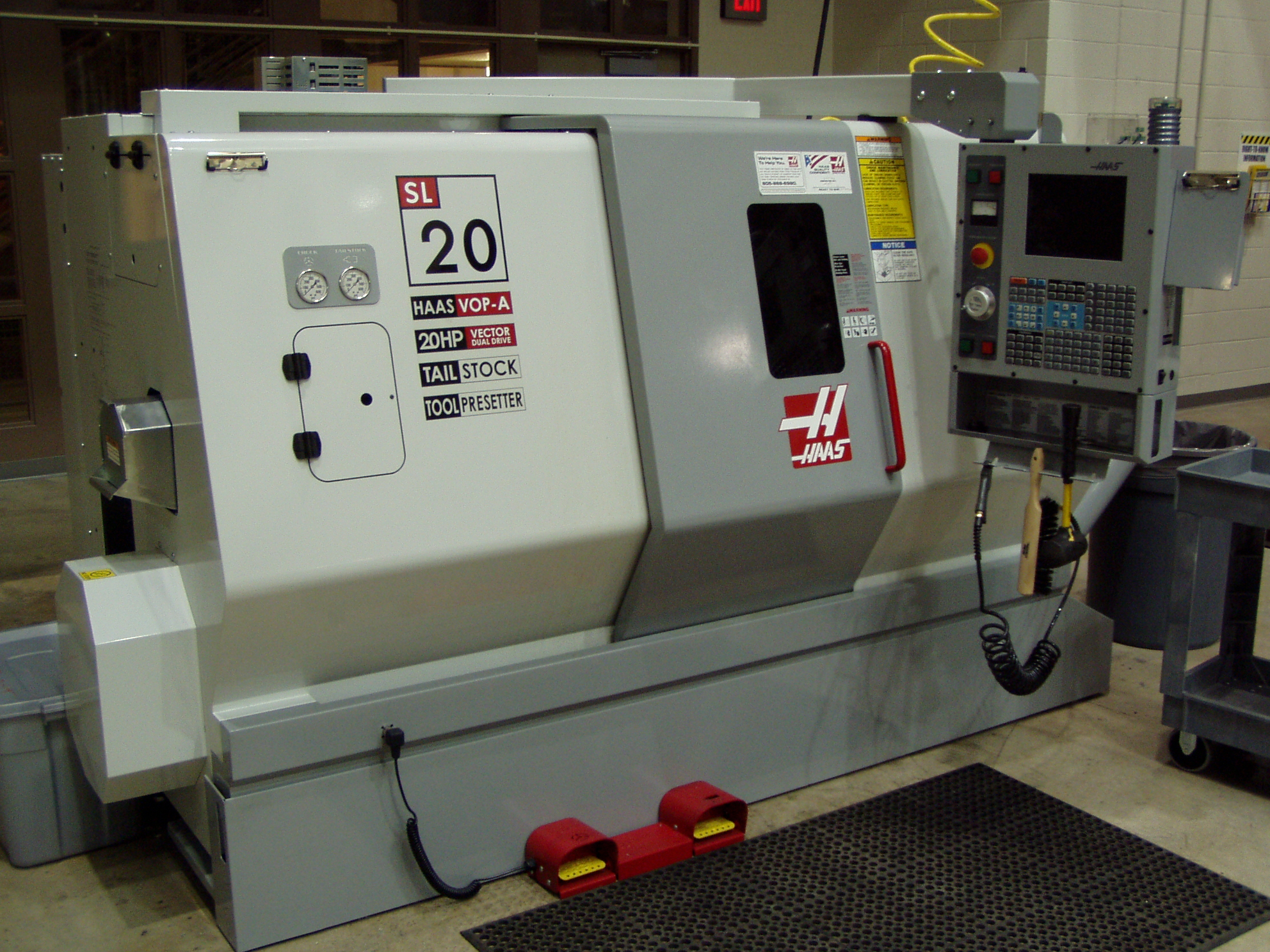
Small CNC Turning Center

The company manufactures several lines of CNC machine tools for the metalworking industry.

=== Vertical Mills ===
==== VF Series ====
VF series mills are a range of 3-axis vertical machining centers, which can be outfitted with 4th and 5th axis drives if so configured. These mills are available in different sizes, ranging from VF-1 to VF-14.

The VF in the name stands for "Very First" as the first machine Haas produced was the VF-1 ("Very First One"). One of these machines was restored by an employee, gifted to Gene Haas, and now resides in Haas's demo room in Oxnard, CA.

==== Universal Machines (UMC) ====
Haas universal machining centers (known as UMC) are 5-axis bridge-type vertical machines. They were first introduced in 2015.

==== Mini Mill ====
The mini mill was introduced as a small footprint alternative to the VF series mills, featuring a smaller casting while still maintaining a 40 taper spindle.

==== Toolroom Mills (TM) ====
The TM series was first introduced as essentially a "CNC-capable toolroom mill”. Originally, these mills did not feature an enclosure, but have since been outfitted with an enclosure that encompasses the bottom and sides of the machine. These machines are characterized by a smaller casting and slower rapids, as they are targeted towards customers who do not require production capabilities.

==== Drill/Tap/Mill Series (DT / DM) ====
The Haas DT series was originally introduced as a 30 taper high-speed machine, ideal for operations where high speed and small footprint are required, but the ability to handle large axial cutting loads is not needed. Eventually, the DM series was introduced as a 40 taper variant of the DT machine, but does not offer the 20,000 RPM spindle option.

==== Compact Mill ====
The CM is focused on machining small parts where high accuracy is required. The CM is a 20 taper machine, with spindles from 30,000 to 50,000 RPM. Haas only offers one machine in this series, the CM-1.

==== Gantry Series (GM / GR) ====
Gantry Series mills feature a static bed, a bridge that moves along the Y axis, and a head that moves along the X axis. The two primary use cases for GM series machines are large molds. GM series machines feature a more substantial casting with improved chip management as opposed to the GR series. The GM-2-5AX is also available, which is simply a GM-2 featuring two extra axes affixed to the head.

==== Other Machines ====
- VM Series machines feature a grid-style table capable of handling more weight than a comparable VF machine.
- VR Series machines are based on the VF series, but include a special head to allow A and B axis capabilities. VR machines are able to machine larger parts than would be possible on a VF machine outfitted with a 5th axis trunnion, as the head is able to span the entire X and Y axis travel, rather than being constrained by the smaller work envelope of a trunnion.
- VMT (Vertical Mill Turn) series mills feature an HSK-T/A63 spindle and are capable of performing both milling and turning operations.
- The VC-400 machine is a pallet-changing vertical mill, based on the design of the EC-400 horizontal mill with a 90 degree head.

=== Certifications ===
Haas Automation is an ISO 9001 certified company. All machine tools carry the ETL Listed mark, certifying that they conform to the NFPA 79 electrical standard for industrial machinery and the Canadian equivalent, CAN/CSA C22.2 No. 73. The company is also entitled to affix the CE mark to its products.

=== HAAS Certification Program ===
HAAS Certification Program was created to provide basic fundamental knowledge required to start CNC machining. It is a two part program for both Mills and Lathes. The first part of the program is an online portion consisting of both videos and quizzes that help users learn and test their knowledge on the machine type they are trying to be certified for. The mill exam consists of sixteen learning videos and quizzes over the course of eleven chapters.

Chapter one goes over the basic understanding of machine tools and use. Chapter two goes over the basic machine safety. Chapter three goes over basic machine start-up. Chapter four goes over the correct way to load and unload parts. Chapter five goes over how to run a simple program. Chapter seven goes over the basic reading of blueprints and shop routers. Chapter eight goes over how to use measuring tools. Chapter nine goes over Basic math behind measuring and tool sizes. Chapter ten introduces mill cutting tools and common work piece materials. Chapter eleven goes over the basic understanding of how to maintain HAAS machines. The Lathe machine exam covers the same material concepts as the mill.

After taking the mill and or lathe exam the user would be able to register for a practical in-person exam. This exam tests the user on everything covered in the online portion and sees how the user can perform hands on. The practical exam may cost a nominal fee at the testing facilities discretion. Usually a fee of around one-hundred and fifty dollars is charged. Once the user passes both the online, and practical exam the user will be HAAS certified. The certification is to prove understanding of HAAS machinery and in certain colleges such as Western Carolina University is used for evaluation of Safety.

== Sales ==
Products are distributed worldwide through a network of independently owned franchised local "factory outlet" businesses that provide sales, service, and applications support for Haas machine tools. Introduced in 1999, with the first outlet established in Torrance, California, it was applied to the company's existing worldwide network, and then expanded to Europe.

== See also ==
- WindShear
- Haas F1 Team
