= Flange (disambiguation) =

A flange is a ridge, a rib or rim.

Flange may also refer to:

- Flanging, an audio effect
- Flanging, part of the process of blocking a felt hat
- Flange gasket, a type of gasket made to fit between two sections of pipe that are flared to provide higher surface area
- Marman clamp, a flange connection used in aerospace plumbing
- Vacuum flange, a flange used in connecting vacuum equipment
- Waveguide flange, a flange used in connecting microwave waveguides
- Flange Desire, a character on the Australian ABC comedy show, The Aunty Jack Show
- Some adult male orangutans develop cheek flaps called flanges
- Collective noun for a group of baboons
