= Intermittent mechanism =

Device by which motion picture film is advanced

Working principle of a Maltese cross or Geneva drive

Animation of a rotating shutter. The film is transported one frame when the shutter is blocking illumination of the film.

An intermittent mechanism or intermittent movement is a device or movement which regularly advances an object, web, or plastic film and then holds it in place. This process is commonly used in industry and manufacturing.

This motion is critical to the use of film in a movie camera or movie projector, allowing for a series of still images to be recorded or projected one after the other. When combined with a shutter mechanism, the still images appear as an uninterrupted moving image, due to a phenomenon called persistence of vision.

== History ==
Intermittent mechanisms were first used in sewing machines, in order for the fabric to be fed through correctly - ensuring it is stationary as each stitch is made, while moving the required distance between stitches.

== Uses ==
Film advance mechanism in the Soviet Luch-2 8mm film projector, based on a Reuleaux triangle.

Intermittent mechanisms were important in early film technology, being used in film cameras and movie projectors. These mechanisms would control various parts of these devices, such as sprocket wheels, claws, or pins coupled to the camera or projector drive mechanism, to allow for the film material to be transported frame by frame, in relation to the shutter being open or closed.

In movie cameras, a rotating shutter opens, exposing the light-sensitive film stock in the film gate to light for a split second, while registration pins hold the film still and ensures that frames are aligned with each other. Once exposed, the shutter closes, blocking light from reaching the film material. As the shutter is closed, a claw driven by an intermittent mechanism such as a cam, pulls down the next film frame into the film gate and the process begins again.

A movie projector works in a similar way, in which the shutter opens when the film is motionless in the film gate, projecting an image, and closes to allow the film to move onto the next frame without the movement being visible. In movie theater projectors, the intermittent movement is often produced by a Geneva drive (Maltese cross mechanism).

== See also ==
- Dwell mechanism
- Fast motion
- Slow motion
- Cam (mechanism)
