= Fuel line =

Hose or pipe used to transfer fuel from one point in a vehicle to another

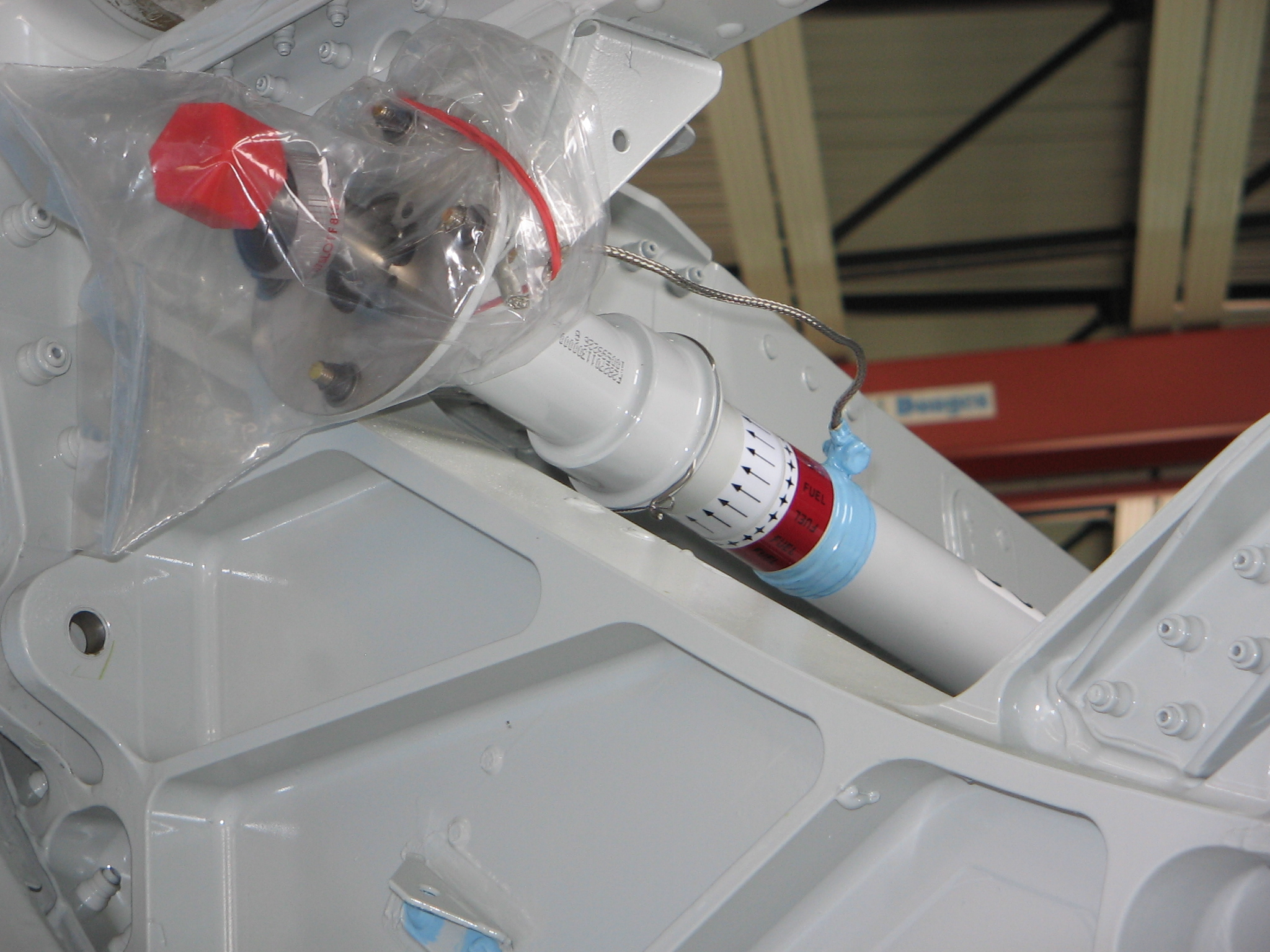
Fuel line feeding the auxiliary power unit of an Airbus A340.

A fuel line is a hose or pipe used to transfer fuel from one point in a vehicle to another. The United States Environmental Protection Agency defines a fuel line as "all hoses or tubing designed to contain liquid fuel or fuel vapor. This includes all hoses or tubing for the filler neck, for connections between dual fuel tanks, and for connecting a carbon canister to the fuel tank. This does not include hoses or tubing for routing crankcase vapors to the engine's intake or any other hoses or tubing that are open to the atmosphere."

== Materials ==
=== Rubber ===
Most vehicles have rubber fuel hoses connecting the fuel pipes on the chassis to the fuel pump or carburetor on the engine. Rubber hoses are flexible and can be cut to length as required, but they have a tendency to perish over time and can rub through if not properly secured.

=== Plastic ===
More modern vehicles may be fitted with fuel lines made of plastic, typically nylon. Plastic fuel lines do not perish and are lighter than metal tubing, but they melt at lower temperatures and cannot be repaired as easily.

=== Steel ===
Many FF or FR vehicles with fuel tanks at the rear are fitted with rigid steel fuel pipes that run the length of the chassis from the tank to the engine bay. Steel pipes are cheap and strong, but can corrode, causing fuel leaks.

=== Copper ===
Older vehicles may be fitted with copper fuel pipes. These are easy to fit and repair, but copper is heavy and expensive when compared with the other options.

== Fittings ==
Traditionally fuel lines had flared or compression fittings on the rigid pipe sections, and hose clamps where rubber hoses attached to metal components. In modern cars with plastic fuel lines, quick release fittings are becoming more common – this allows the fuel system components to simply clip together.

== Priming ==
The primer bulb can be found on the fuel line between the gasoline tank and the carburetor. When one primes the carburetor, fuel is pushed from the carb bowl to the barrel using the rubber primer bulb.

== See also ==
- List of auto parts
