= Duplex worm =

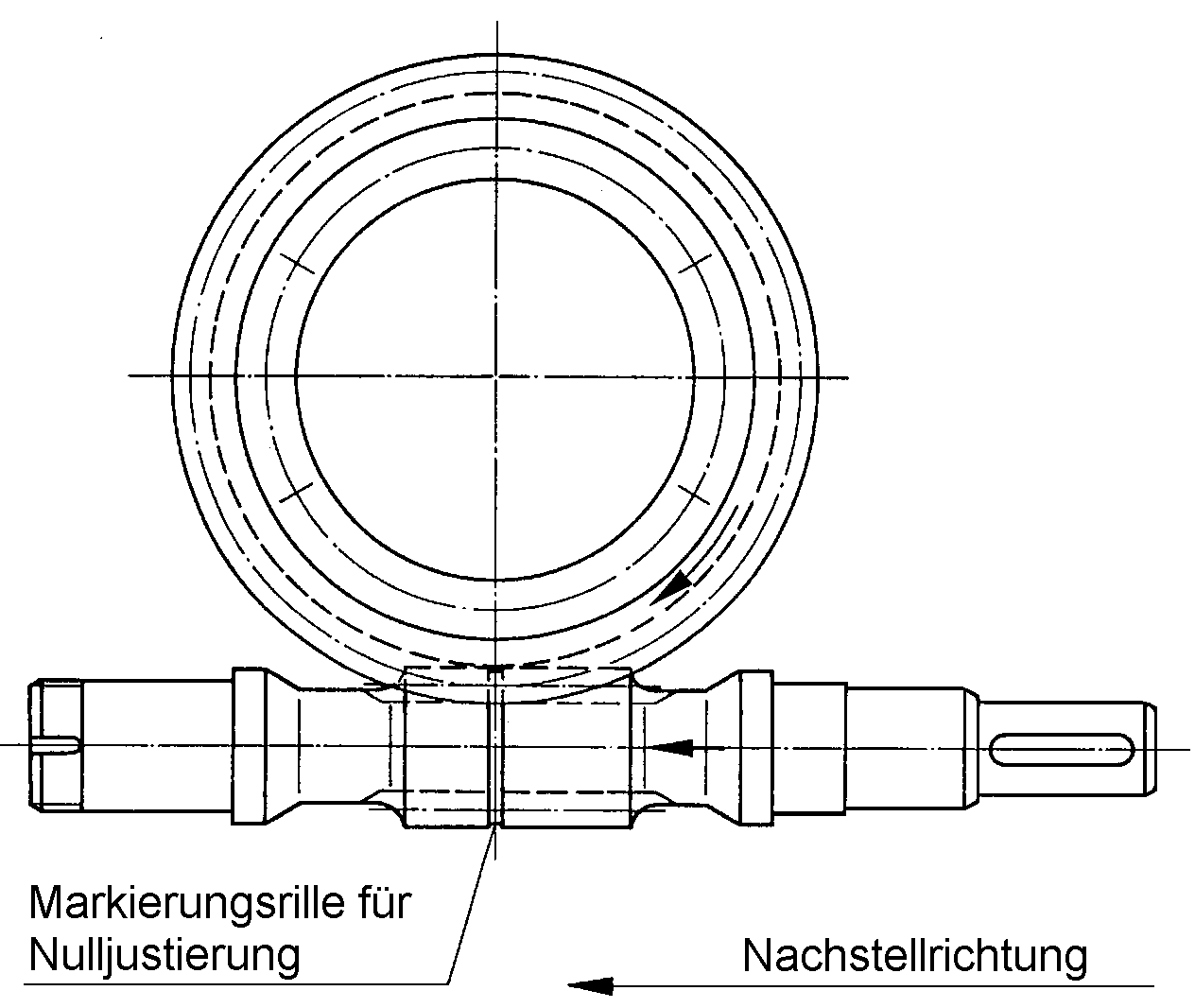
fig.1

A duplex worm or dual lead worm is a worm gear set where the two flanks are manufactured with slightly different modules and/or diameter quotients. As a result of this, different lead angles on both tooth profiles are obtained, so that the tooth thickness is continuously increasing all over the worm length, while the gap between two threads is decreasing. This allows control of backlash.

At the worm wheel, the different modules result in different addendum modification coefficients and rolling circle diameters at both flanks. Because of this the profiles are different at the front and at the rear flank. The thickness of each tooth and the tooth gaps remain constant at the circumference of the wheel.

Backlash adjustment is done by shifting the worm axially, so that the section of the worm with the needed tooth thickness will be in contact with the wheel, giving the desired backlash (fig. 1).

This way, backlash can be easily adjusted to any desired value when mounting the gear, and even worn gears can be readjusted at any time delicately and continuously, without modifying the tooth contact or creating meshing interference.

== Other possibilities of backlash adjustment ==
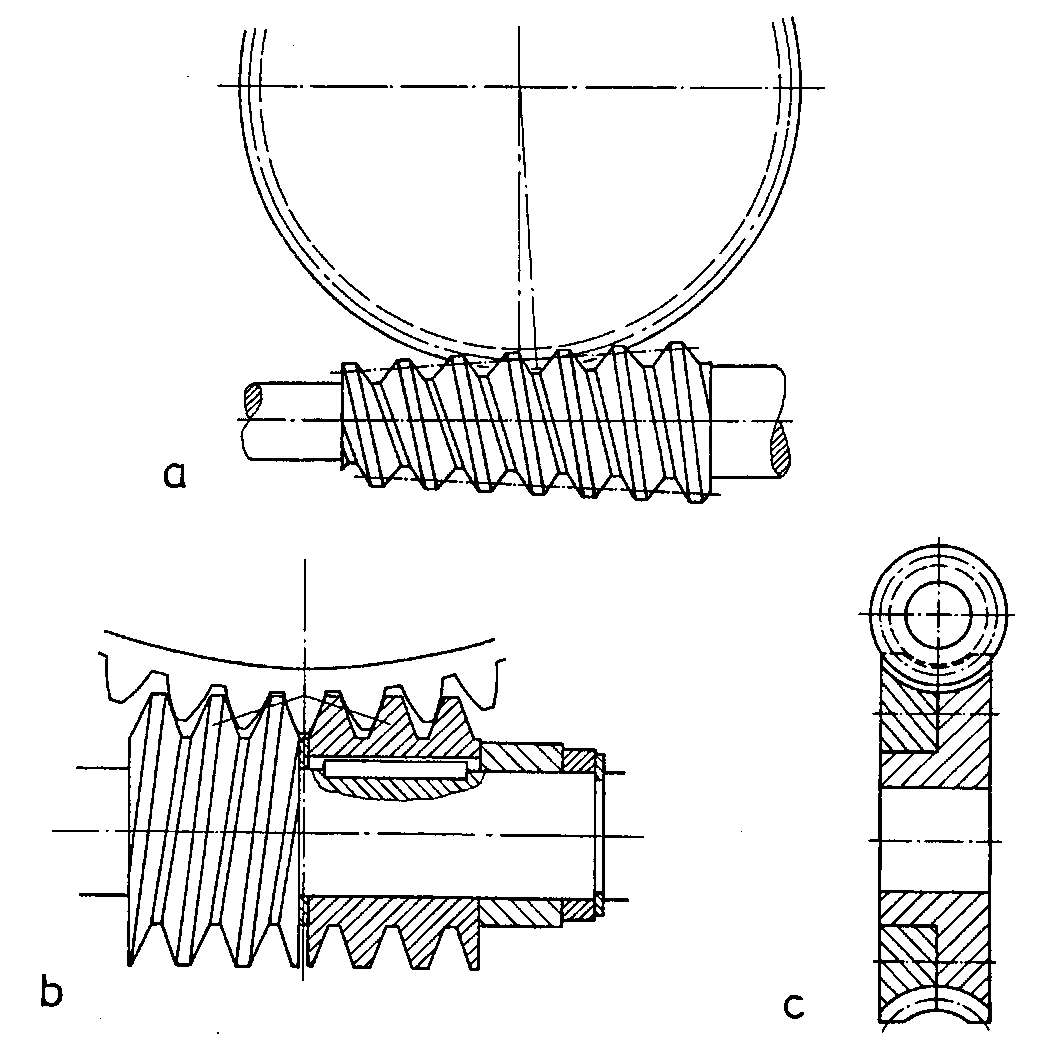
fig.2

Besides the above explained duplex method, there are various possibilities to adjust the backlash of worm gears:

- variation of center distance, by rotating an eccentric hub, in which the worm shaft and/or the worm gear wheel are cradled
- axial shifting of a conical worm (fig. 2a)
- division of the worm in two halves (fig. 2b), to be rotated or shifted relatively to each other. (system Ott)
- division of the wheel in two disks (fig. 2c), to be rotated relatively to each other.

However all these methods demonstrate substantial disadvantages:

- adjustments and/or readjustments are interfering with the geometrically accurate meshing.
- they shift the contact profile zone and change its form and size.
- with this they decrease the load-carrying capacity and deteriorate the efficiency.
- each adjustment causes a tremendous amount of start-up wear.
- the dangers of wrong assembly and destruction of the worm gear set are tremendous.

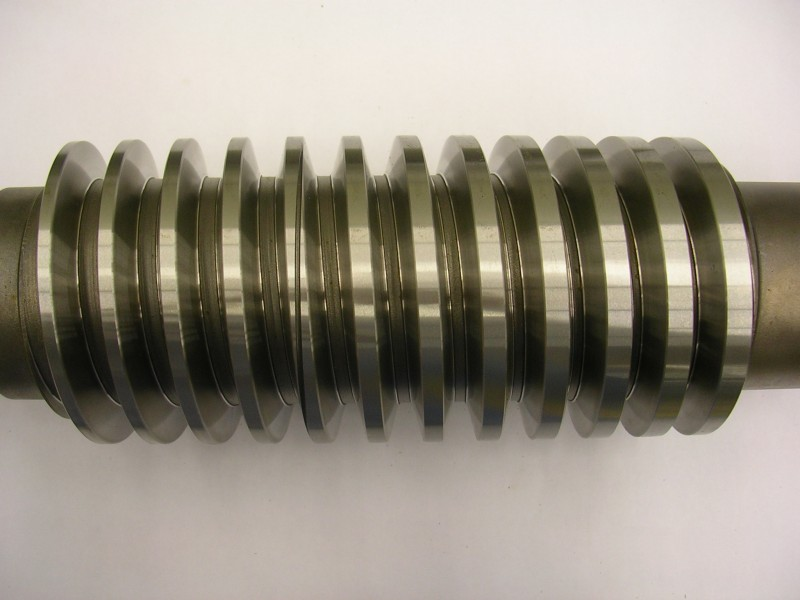
fig.3 part of a duplex worm shaft in a rotary table

Duplex gearings do not create these kind of problems.

They permit an always geometrically accurate teeth contact and beyond that, very delicate backlash adjustment. Neither the evolved contact area, the load-carrying capacity nor the actual efficiency are affected. In addition as duplex teeth are executed as involute gear they are insensitive in regards to modifications of the center distance, e.g. caused by worm shaft deflections.

== Setting of backlash ==
Installing and resetting of a duplex worm wheelset is typically done as follows:

- Mount worm shaft and wheel sequentially. The arrows for positioning on both parts have to point in the same direction. (Fig. 1)
- The shaft has to be mounted with bearings in an axial position before position zero. In this position the shaft has still backlash against the wheel.
- The wheel is mounted in its housing, but is still axially displaceable, i.e. transverse to the worm shaft axis.
- Both flanks of the worm shaft will now be coated with spotting color. Then rotate the shaft by hand in both directions by at least 2 x 360°, so that the marking ink is transferred from the worm flanks to the flanks of the teeth of the wheel. This creates the load pattern in the contact region.
- The wheel has to be displaced axially, up to an optimal position where the load pattern on front and back flank are approximately equally distant to the center of the wheel.
- In this optimal position the wheel has to be fixed axially.
- The shaft can now be screwed in to the zero position (notch in height of the wheel axle) or until another desired backlash.
- Now, the shaft is axially secured in this position.

== Applications ==
Duplex gears are mainly utilized where any backlash is unwanted or can be harmful, to maintain repeated high precision positioning in both directions, to prevent impulse loaded damage, and when the contact flanks are alternating. Common applications include: rotary and tilting tables, milling machines, and presses.
