= Marman clamp =

Type of heavy-duty band clamp

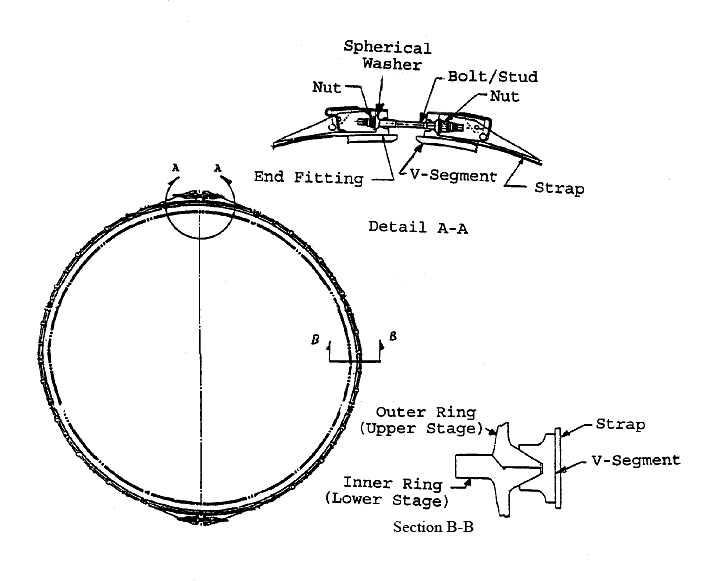
Typical Marman Clamp System

A Marman clamp, also known as a V-band clamp, is a type of heavy-duty band clamp; it allows two cylindrical objects to be clamped together end-to-end with a ring clamp. It is sometimes also known as a "Marman ring". It consists of a circular strap with an interior V-shaped groove. Tension is applied to the strap with a threaded bolt and nuts connecting to the ends of the strap. As the circumferential tension increases, the V-groove wedges over flanges on the circular parts to be assembled, providing the axial force that holds the ends of the two cylinders together. The Marman clamp is an alternative to a bolted flange connection which would be heavier and require more labor to connect. Another variety uses a flat strap, used where systems carry low pressure or to hold a cylindrical object in position.

== Hose connectors ==
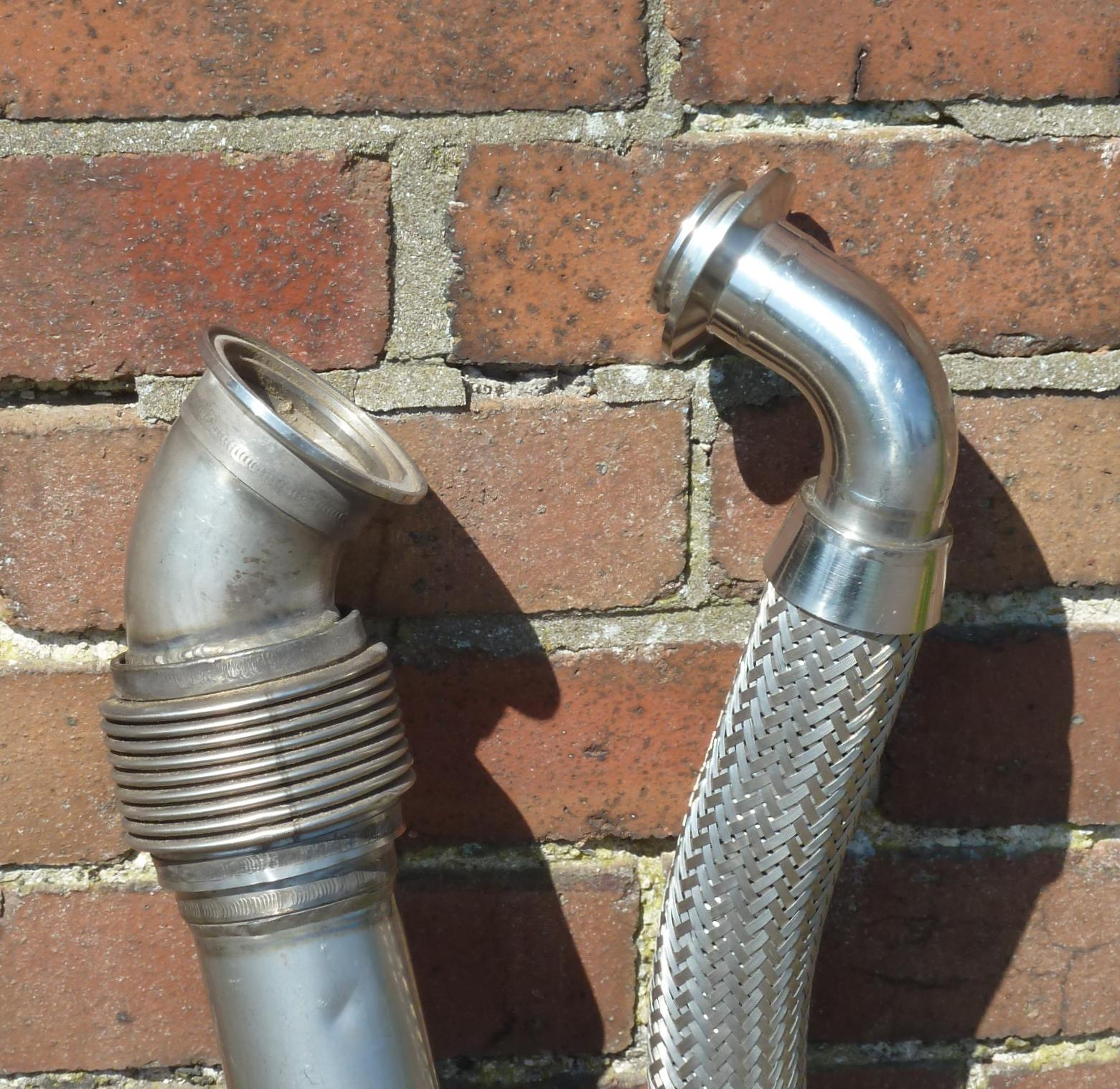
Aerospace pipe fittings with flanges for Marman clamps: a semi-rigid bleed air duct from a jet engine (left) and a semi-flexible fuel hose (right).

A common use for Marman clamps is as quick-disconnect connectors in flexible aircraft fuel lines.

== Spacecraft separation ==
Marman clamps are used extensively in spaceflight systems and are common mechanical load-transfer and clamping mechanisms for connecting the upper stage and the satellite payload of space vehicles, for example, on the Cassini Plasma Spectrometer on the Cassini orbiter. They may also be used to join stages of a booster rocket.

Early separation systems using Marman clamps used explosive bolts for release. These have problems of unpredictability, the need to contain debris and difficulties in testing them. A more recent approach uses a screw thread. The tension of the clamp band itself is used to power the unscrewing of a central bolt, when released by a pyrotechnic pin puller triggered by a set of redundant NASA Standard Initiators (NSIs).

== History ==
The Marman clamp was first produced by Herbert Marx, better known by his stage name Zeppo Marx; it was manufactured by his and partner A. Dale Herman's company, Marman Products. British-born James Thomas King, who had developed a career in aeronautical engineering and aircraft manufacture in Canada before moving to the United States, applied for patents on a hose clamp in mid-1941, and they were granted early the next year. In July 1943, King granted Marman exclusive rights to make the clamp and sell it internationally. In 1947, King filed a suit against Marman, claiming breach of contract and calling for a financial accounting. The parties settled the action out of court and signed a new contract, in April 1948, by which time King had become a founding director of the helicopter cargo airline, Los Angeles Airways, Inc.

At the time the Marman clamp was designed to secure cargo during transport. The U.S. Military also used Marman clamps to transport the atomic bombs used at the end of the Second World War.

Marman clamps are found in many modern moving vehicles, though the screw band type clamp is becoming more popular.

== See also ==
- Hose clamp
- Jubilee Clip
