= Band clamp =

Device used to secure an object

A band clamp is a generic term for a holding device usually consisting of a strap of metal or cloth formed into a loop, with a mechanism to forcibly adjust the diameter, thereby exerting a squeezing force on an object within the loop.

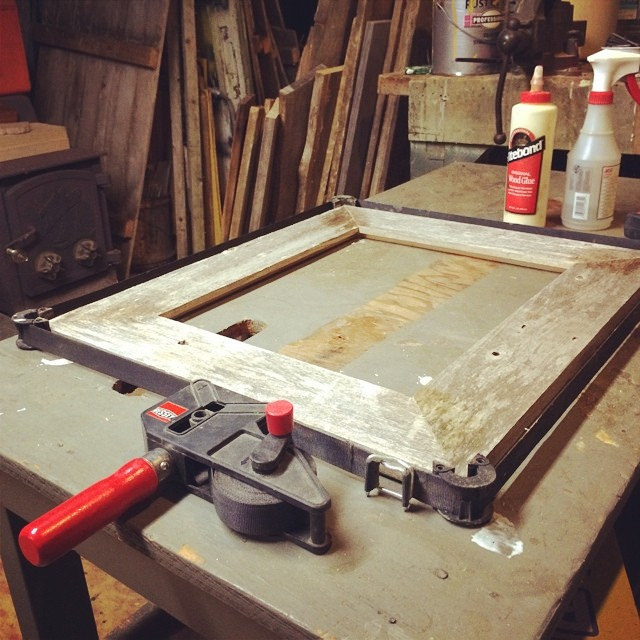
A band clamp used to clamp a mitered picture frame.

One type of band clamp known as a web clamp has a band usually made of nylon type cloth webbing. It can slip and stretch around irregularly shaped objects such as frames, packages, skids or even trailer loads.

Clamping pressure is applied either through a mechanical method such as a screw or ratchet mechanism that tightens the band, or through the elastic nature of the band material itself. There are a range of styles of band clamp available for purchase, in particular the type used for framing as described above. Other web clamps include ratchet straps.

== See also ==
- Hose clamp
- Jubilee clip
