= Hirth joint =

Type of mechanical connection

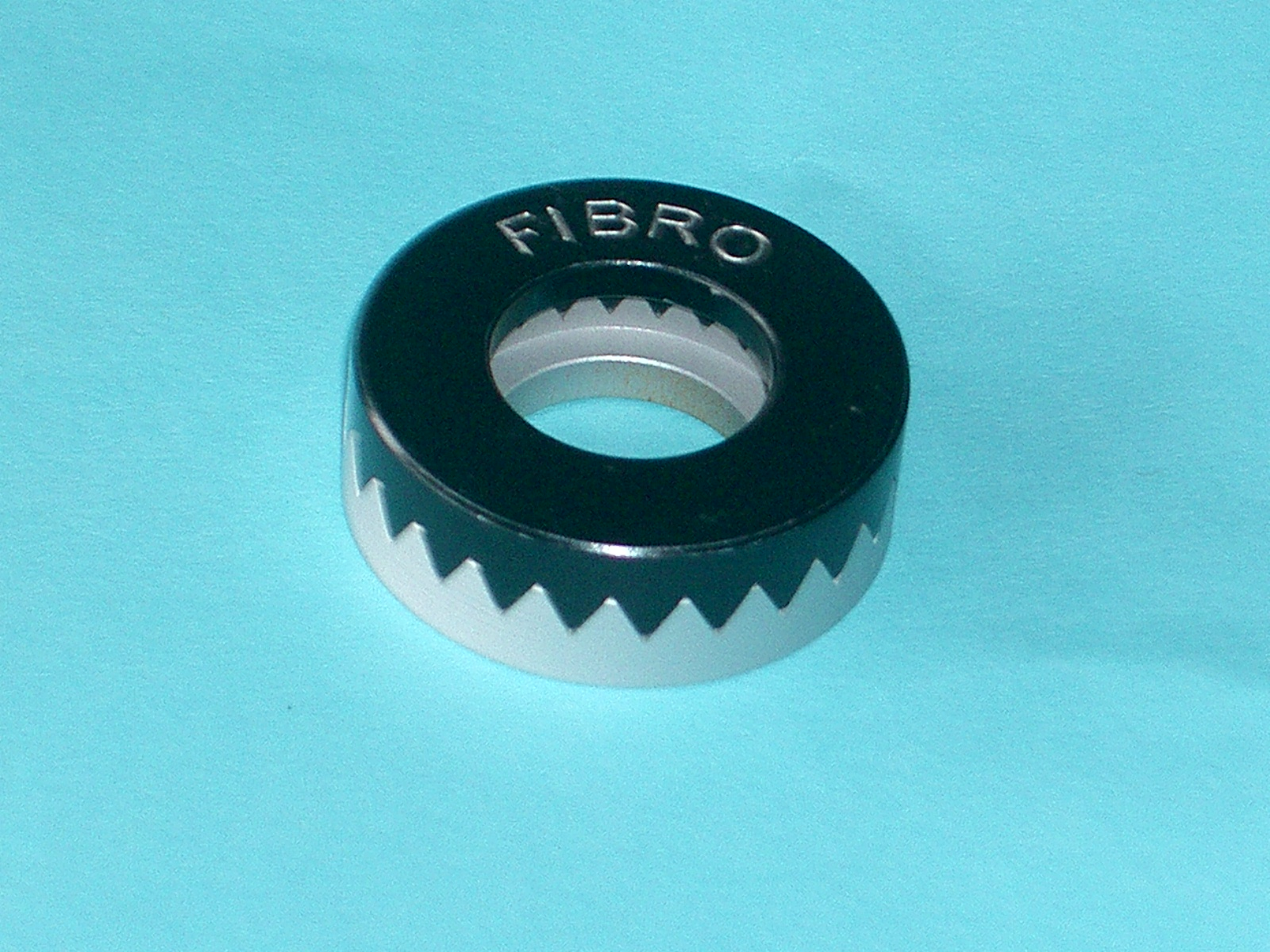
Hirth joint made from anodized aluminum to show the meshing of the teeth

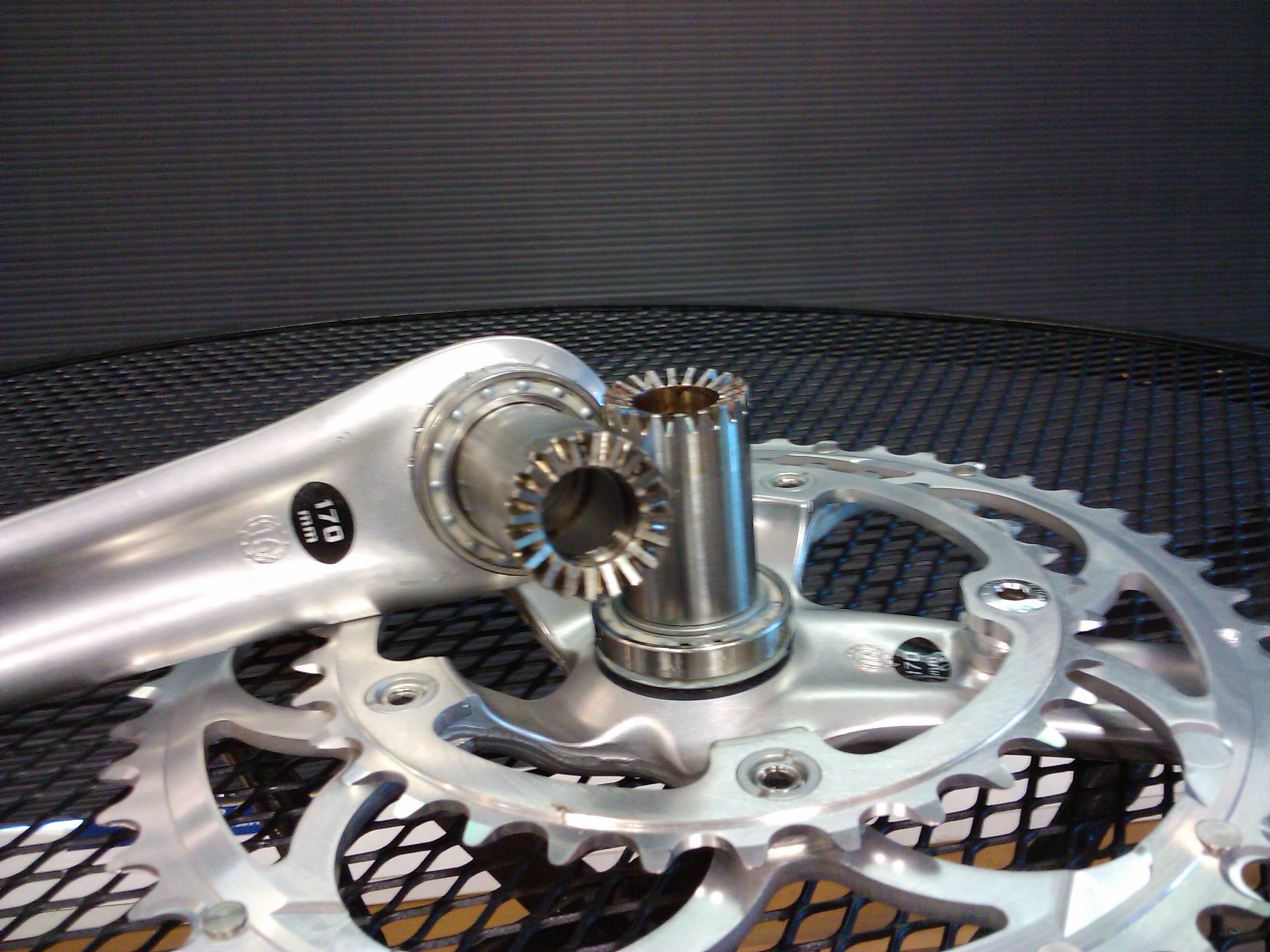
Hirth joint (disassembled) between the semi-axles of a Campagnolo Ultra-Torque crankset

A Hirth joint or Hirth coupling is a type of mechanical connection named after its developer Albert Hirth. It is used to connect two pieces of a shaft together and is characterized by tapered teeth that mesh together on the end faces of each half shaft. Hirth joints are not considered to be the same as face spline joints, due to their differing geometry.

== Construction ==
Hirth joints consist of radial teeth formed by grooves milled or ground into the end face of a cylindrical shaft.

The teeth mesh around a ring, as the torque capacity of teeth increases with their diameter. This ring is arranged to be at the maximal possible diameter for the space available. The centre of a shaft is not toothed, as this would add little torque capacity to the coupling and the increasingly narrow teeth would become impractical to cut.

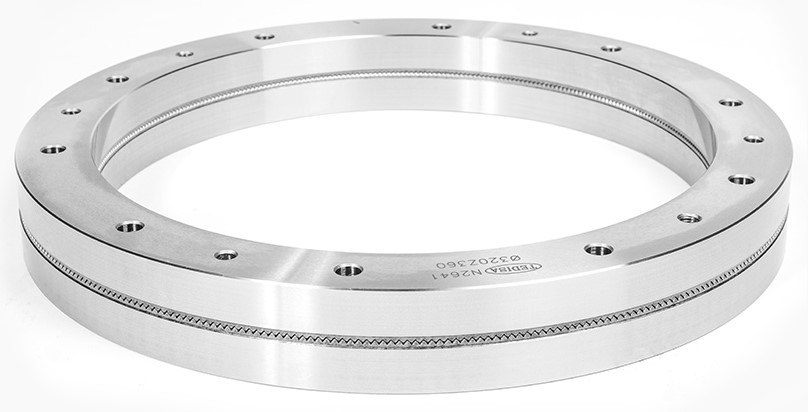
Industrial Hirth coupling showing the precision-ground radial teeth and the ring-shaped tooth arrangement.

For instance, a shaft of 60 mm diameter can be toothed in a 12 mm wide ring only (inner diameter is 36 mm) without jeopardizing the load-bearing capacity of the shaft.

Tapered, symmetrical serrations are used. Profile angles of 60 and 90 degrees are used. A key feature of the Hirth joint is that, unlike simple splines, the load-bearing faces of the joint are tapered. This allows the joint to be tightened so that there is no backlash by simply applying an axial load. This is done by either bolting the shafts together or by applying spring pressure from an external housing. This lack of backlash also reduces wear due to fretting.

The coupling is defined by the groove count, the outer diameter of the cylindrical feature, the bottom angle of the grooves (to the axis of the cylindrical feature), and their depth. Hirth joints are designed as mating pairs and, unlike splines, there is no standardised off-the-shelf sizing system for them.

== Advantages ==
- Very high loads can be transferred in a small enclosure of only a few parts (two serrated faces and a bolt fixing them together).
- There is no lag in the joint.
- The joint is self-centering (because of this the Hirth coupling is used in very high RPM gas turbines).
- If there is some fretting wear resulting in looseness, tightening the fixing bolt can restore firmness.
- Unlike Curvic couplings, which are optimized for high-speed rotating assemblies and centrifugal stress distribution, Hirth couplings are specifically preferred for high-precision indexing applications. Their straight-tooth geometry provides superior static stiffness and positional repeatability, making them the industry standard for rotary tables, indexing heads, and machine tool turrets where stability under heavy cutting loads is the primary requirement.

== Disadvantages ==
- The manufacturing process is complex, time-consuming and consequently expensive.

== Uses ==
Hirth's joints were first used in aircraft engine crankshafts. A large number of cylinders and often the need for reduction gears and supercharger drives made it impractical to manufacture a one-piece crankshaft, so Hirth joints were used to couple the sections. They have been used in complex crankshafts for many years afterward, particularly where the output power was taken from a central drive gear. As a large gear could neither be formed-in-place nor passed over the crank webs, it could be machined separately and placed between two half-crankshafts with Hirth's joints. They are also used in gas turbine shafts, in accessories for surgical operating tables, in agricultural machines for fixing tools etc., and in bike parts and frames, such as Campagnolo's "Ultra-Torque" bicycle crankset, and in Bicycle Torque Couplings.

Specialized's "S-Works" top-level racing mountain bike cranksets use a Hirth joint with a center hex-head threaded rod to secure the crank halves together.

The crank design and technology was licensed from Lightning Cycle Dynamics, which utilized and patented a two-piece bicycle crank using the Hirth coupling in 1995.

Large-diameter Hirth couplings can effect extremely accurate and repeatable rotational positioning. For this reason, they are used in indexing heads and rotary tables for precision machining and inspection tasks. Commercial products such as the Ultradex achieve sub-arc-second accuracy.

Hirth-like joints are often found on camera support equipment, where they are called rosettes.

== Curvic coupling ==
Curvic couplings are similar in concept and appearance to Hirth couplings, except that their teeth are curved instead of straight. Like Hirth couplings, they lock the components together in an unlockable/removable way and provide indexability.

== See also ==
- Rotating spline
