= Economic Security Council of Ukraine =

Ukrainian economic security organisation

- Рада економічної безпеки України
- Abbreviation: ESCU
- Formation: 30 November 2021; 4 years ago
- Headquarters: Kyiv, Ukraine
- Location: 10A Sofiivska Street, Kyiv 01001
- Key people: Ilona Khmeleva; Denys Hutyk
- Website: escu.ua

The Economic Security Council of Ukraine (ESCU; Ukrainian: Рада економічної безпеки України) is a Ukrainian organisation based in Kyiv that conducts research on economic and national security issues affecting Ukraine and its partner countries.

Its work covers Russian military-industrial supply chains, international sanctions and export controls, cybersecurity, defence-industry development and foreign direct investment screening. Its research included in testimony to the United States Congress. ESCU is also a co-founder of the National Sanctions Coalition.

== History ==
ESCU was established in Kyiv on 30 November 2021. Its stated aim was to address internal and external threats to the national security of Ukraine and its partner countries. Following the beginning of the full-scale Russian invasion of Ukraine in February 2022, the organisation began researching Russia's military, economic, political and cyber activities. Its research has focused on identifying vulnerabilities in Russian systems and examining possible responses to security threats.

In 2025, ESCU expanded its activities to include research on defence-industry development and foreign direct investment screening.

== Research and activities ==
=== Russian military-industrial complex ===
Since 2022, ESCU has researched Russia's military-industrial complex, focusing on its dependence on imported equipment, raw materials, components and other supplies.

In 2023, the organisation published a report on the dependence of Russian weapons manufacturers on foreign computer numerical control (CNC) machine tools. The report was described as the first public study of the subject. An expanded version, released in November 2023, was included in testimony given by economist Elina Ribakova to a United States Senate subcommittee in February 2024.

In 2024, ESCU examined China's role in supplying Russia with industrial equipment. Later that year, its analysts worked with the Royal United Services Institute (RUSI) and the Open Source Centre on a report titled Ore to Ordnance. The study examined the supply chain for Russian artillery, from the extraction and processing of raw materials to the production and delivery of howitzers and ammunition to the front line in Ukraine.

In 2025, ESCU investigated Russia's dependence on imported components for the production of Iskander-M ballistic missiles and Su-34 and Su-35 fighter aircraft. Its research also covered Russian imports of strategic minerals, including antimony oxide from Belgium and chromite supplied through the European Union.

In December 2025, ESCU, RUSI, NLI and Panoptikon presented a joint study titled Disrupting Russian Air Defence Production: Reclaiming the Sky. The study examined vulnerabilities in the production of Russian air defence systems.

In July 2026, ESCU published Salt of the Earth: How Russia Supplies Its Military-Industrial Complex with Strategic Minerals Amid War and Sanctions. The report identified more than US$1.1 billion worth of strategic mineral supplies to Russia. According to the report, these materials are used in the production of military aircraft, missile systems, engines, armoured vehicles, electronics and ammunition. The report also examined Russia's plans to increase domestic production of scarce raw materials. It stated that most of the planned projects were not expected to become operational before 2035. According to the study, restrictions on external supplies could affect the availability of materials used in Russian weapons production.

=== Sanctions and export controls ===
Since 2022, ESCU has investigated the supply of goods to Russia in the context of international sanctions and export-control restrictions. The organisation has also advocated additional sanctions against Russia. Its research has covered deliveries to Russia of goods manufactured by DN Solutions, SIR Industriale SpA, Fargʻonaazot, Michelin, PBS Velká Bíteš, Danieli, Campine NV and I Machine Technology.

In March 2023, PBS NewsHour published an investigation by ESCU into alleged violations of US export-control regulations by Haas Automation. In January 2025, the Office of Foreign Assets Control (OFAC) and the Bureau of Industry and Security (BIS) announced combined penalties of US$2.5 million against Haas Automation for supplying CNC machine tool parts to sanctioned entities.

In 2023, ESCU representatives met members of the US Congress, including members of the House Committee on Foreign Affairs, its Subcommittee on Europe and the Senate Committee on Foreign Relations. In 2024, ESCU co-organised an event in the Danish Parliament (Folketing) with PR Army and Rasmussen Global. In March 2025, the organisation held an online workshop titled War and Sanctions: How to Counter Aggressor States in cooperation with the Main Directorate of Intelligence (HUR) of Ukraine's Ministry of Defence.

In 2025, ESCU reported shipments of natural rubber to Russia through Latvia. The material is used in the production of tyres for military aircraft. Following the publication of the findings, Latvian security authorities opened an investigation into the shipments. Latvia also announced that it would seek to include natural rubber in an EU sanctions package. On 23 April 2026, the European Union adopted its 20th sanctions package, which extended the export ban to natural rubber supplied to Russia.

In August 2026, Ukraine imposed sanctions on five companies belonging to the Rusal group, including the Bratsk, Sayanogorsk and Krasnoyarsk aluminium smelters. ESCU had identified these facilities as major Russian alumina importers in its Salt of the Earth report.

=== Cybersecurity and technology diplomacy ===
ESCU conducts research on cyberattacks and other forms of digital activity related to Russian aggression against Ukraine. Its work also covers possible responses to cyber threats. The organisation has advocated classifying cyberattacks as war crimes and restricting technology transfers to authoritarian regimes.

In 2022, ESCU and the State Service of Special Communications and Information Protection of Ukraine (SSSCIP) published a joint study titled Cyberattacks, Artillery, Propaganda: An Overview of the Dimensions of Russian Aggression.

The organisation has also worked with the Ministry of Foreign Affairs of Ukraine, the National Coordination Centre for Cybersecurity under the National Security and Defence Council of Ukraine, and the Strategic Communications Directorate of the Office of the Commander-in-Chief of the Armed Forces of Ukraine.

In 2024, ESCU published the study Cyberaggression: Sanctions and Accountability. In 2025, it published the report Gaps in Cyber Sanctions: Building a United Front.

In July 2025, ESCU signed a partnership memorandum with the Association of People's Deputies of Ukraine and the Krach Institute for Tech Diplomacy at Purdue University in the United States. The agreement was part of the Trusted Tech Network initiative.

In January 2026, the Verkhovna Rada established a cross-party parliamentary group called the Ukraine Technology Diplomacy Platform, which later joined the Global Trusted Tech Network.

On 29 April 2026, a study titled Spyware Bias: The Security Shortfall in Norms-Based Governance, prepared by ESCU in cooperation with the Ukraine Technology Diplomacy Platform, was presented at the Verkhovna Rada.

On 24 June 2026, ESCU presented a report titled Operationalising Digital Sovereignty for Ukraine: Trusted Integration as the Path to Recovery, Security, and Global Digital Cooperation at the Ukraine Recovery Conference 2026 in Gdańsk. The report was prepared in cooperation with Amazon Web Services (AWS).

=== Defence industry ===
In September 2025, ESCU presented a study titled Analysis of Ukraine's Export Control Systems.

In October 2025, representatives of the organisation's defence-industry team proposed establishing an International Defence Procurement Agency (IDPA) at the Defending Europe's Future conference in Copenhagen, organised by Tænketanken EUROPA.

In November 2025, ESCU presented the study EU/NATO Technology and IP Governance Models for Ukraine. The report examined intellectual property protection in Ukraine's defence industry and argued that weaknesses in the system could lead to the loss of defence-related innovations. It also proposed changes to the relevant legislation.

=== Investment screening ===
ESCU supports the introduction of a foreign direct investment (FDI) screening system in Ukraine. The organisation considers such a system a means of assessing investment risks to the national economy.

In June 2026, ESCU published Protection Without Isolation: Investment Screening as an Element of Ukraine's Economic Security. The report examined a draft law on foreign direct investment screening prepared by the Verkhovna Rada Committee on Economic Development.

Later that month, ESCU presented another study, Proactive Screening: How Businesses Can Prepare for a New Security Mechanism, at a discussion organised by the U.S.–Ukraine Business Council and the Center for International Private Enterprise during the Ukraine Recovery Conference 2026 in Gdańsk.

In September 2026, ESCU representatives visited Washington, D.C., to discuss investment screening. In October, they attended the CFIS 26 conference in Brussels and met representatives of the European Commission to discuss the alignment of Ukraine's investment-screening legislation with EU rules. ESCU representatives also raised the issue of maintaining restrictions on investment originating from Russia.

== Partnerships ==
=== National Sanctions Coalition ===
ESCU is a co-founder of the National Sanctions Coalition, a network of Ukrainian civil-society initiatives focused on sanctions enforcement and countering Russian aggression. In May 2025, the coalition presented a report titled White Paper: The Future of European Leadership in Economic Deterrence of Aggression in Brussels. The document was endorsed by the Interagency Working Group on State Sanctions Policy Implementation under the Cabinet of Ministers of Ukraine. It examined the implementation of EU sanctions and proposed measures to strengthen the bloc's economic security and increase economic pressure on Russia.

=== Organized Crime and Corruption Reporting Project ===
Since 2026, ESCU has been a partner of the Organized Crime and Corruption Reporting Project (OCCRP) in Ukraine. As part of the partnership, ESCU works with investigative journalists across the OCCRP network. Its activities include researching international supply chains, identifying channels through which sanctioned goods reach Russia's military-industrial complex and preparing recommendations on sanctions and export controls.
