= Jubilee Clip =

Type of band clamp

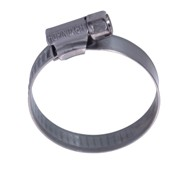
A worm drive hose clamp similar to the Jubilee Clip tradename product of the Robinson company.

A Jubilee Clip is a genericised brand name for a worm drive hose clamp, a type of band clamp, consisting of a circular metal band or strip combined with a worm gear fixed to one end. It is designed to hold a soft, pliable hose onto a rigid circular pipe, or sometimes a solid spigot, of smaller diameter.

Other names for the worm gear hose clamp include worm drive, worm gear clips, clamps, or just hose clips. In the United Kingdom, Ireland and some of the former British colonies, the Jubilee Clip dominated the market to the extent that Jubilee Clips tend to be known almost exclusively by their brand name. In Canada, these are sometimes called Tridon Clamps after the Canadian manufacturer of these hose or gear clamps.

== History ==
The Jubilee brand clamp brand was started by Commander Lumley Robinson of the British Royal Navy, who was granted the first patent for his device by the London Patent Office in 1921 while operating as a sole trader. It is now subject to a registered trademark in many countries around the world. The design has been copied with many variations, and there are many other hose clips of a similar design.

== See also ==
- Marman clamp
- Cable tie
