= Worm drive =

Gear arrangement

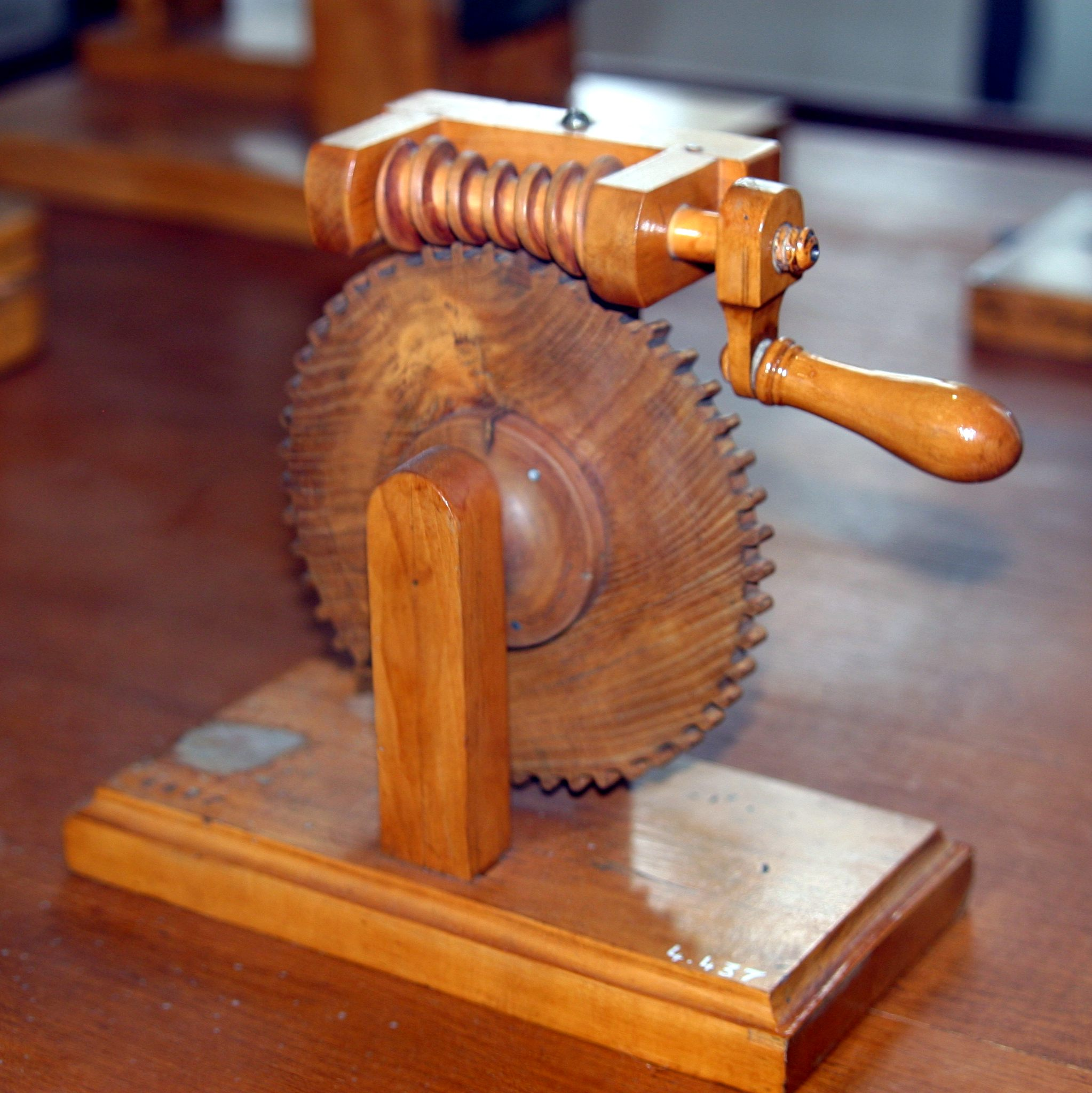
Worm and worm wheel

A worm drive is a gear arrangement in which a worm (which is a gear in the form of a screw) meshes with a worm wheel (which is similar in appearance to a spur gear). Its main purpose is to translate the motion of two perpendicular axes or to translate circular motion to linear motion (example: band type hose clamp).The two elements are also called the worm screw and worm gear. The terminology is often confused by imprecise use of the term worm gear to refer to the worm, the worm wheel, or the worm drive as a unit.

The worm drive or "endless screw" was invented by either Archytas of Tarentum, Apollonius of Perga, or Archimedes, the last one being the most probable author. The worm drive later appeared in the Indian subcontinent, for use in roller cotton gins, during the Delhi Sultanate in the thirteenth or fourteenth centuries.

== Explanation ==
Worm gear with 4-start worm and throated gear wheel

A gearbox designed using a worm and worm wheel is considerably smaller than one made from plain spur gears, and has its drive axes at 90° to each other. With a single-start worm, for each 360° turn of the worm, the worm wheel advances by only one tooth. Therefore, regardless of the worm's size (sensible engineering limits notwithstanding), the gear ratio is the "size of the worm wheel - to - 1". Given a single-start worm, a 20-tooth worm wheel reduces the speed by the ratio of 20:1. With spur gears, a gear of 12 teeth must match with a 240-tooth gear to achieve the same 20:1 ratio. Therefore, if the diametrical pitch (DP) of each gear is the same, then, in terms of the physical size of the 240 tooth gear to that of the 20 tooth gear, the worm arrangement is considerably smaller in volume.

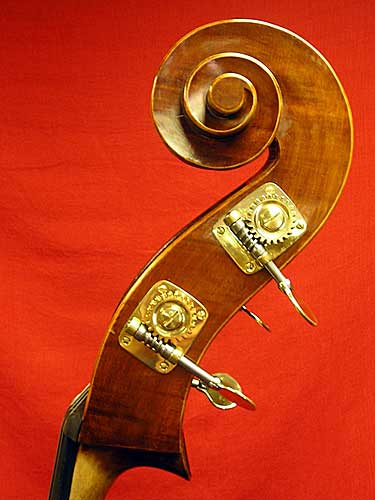
A double bass features worm gears as tuning mechanisms

== Types ==
=== Types of worm drives ===
The entire drive (both worm and wheel) can be classified as follows:

Non-throated worm drives
These don't have a throat, or groove, machined around the circumference of either the worm or worm wheel.
Single-throated worm drives
The worm wheel is throated.
Double-throated worm drives
Both gears are throated. This type of gearing can support the highest loading.

=== Types of worms ===
These classifications refer to the worm itself:

Enveloping worm (hourglass worm)
The worm has one or more teeth, and increases in diameter from its middle portion toward both ends.

Animation of globoidal worm gear and wheel. In this example, the teeth are asymmetric for driving the wheel in one direction with a low pressure angle.

Double-enveloping worm
The worm's gearing comprises enveloping worms mated with fully enveloping worm wheels. It is also known as globoidal worm gearing.

== Direction of transmission ==
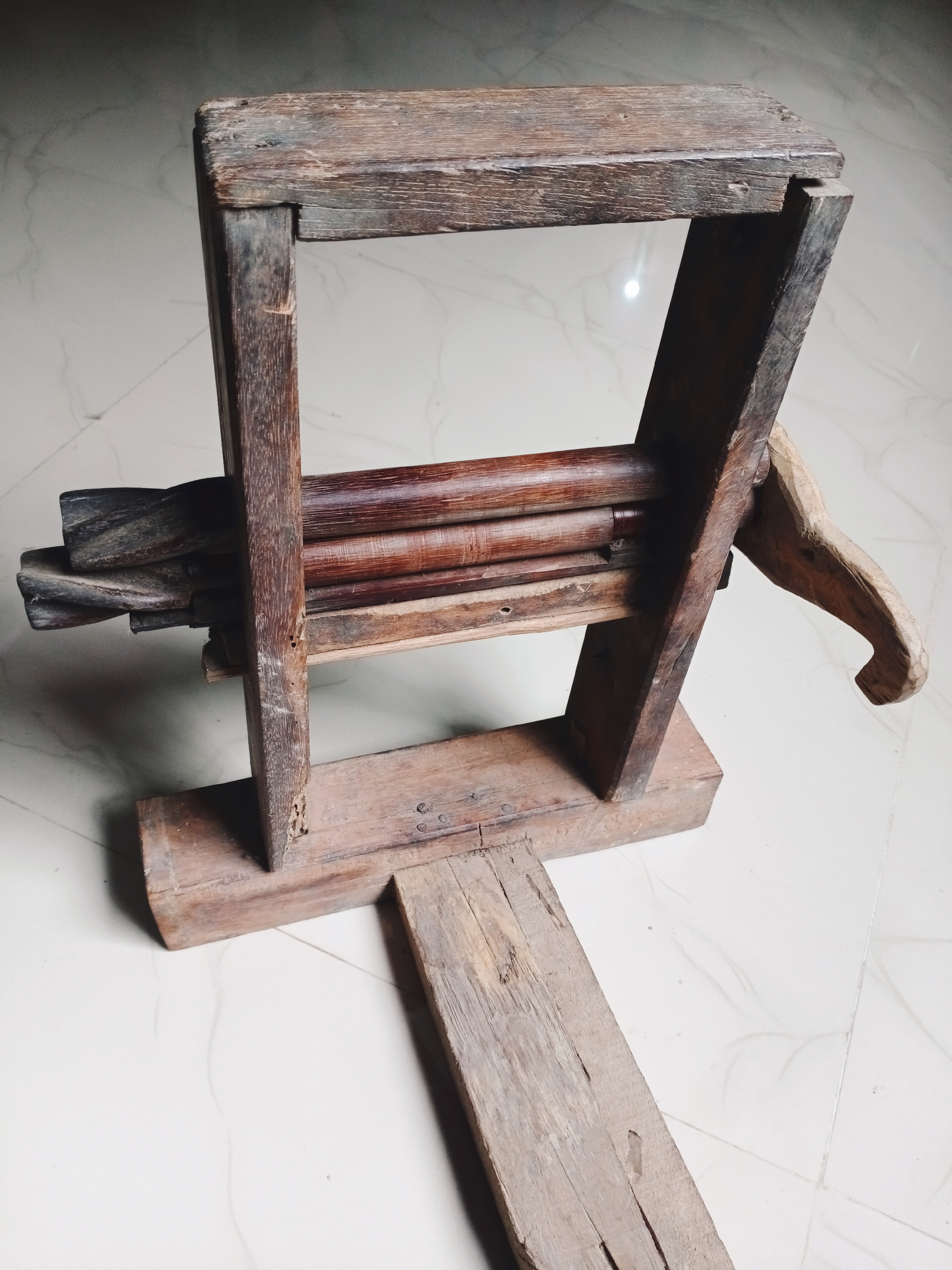
A worm gear cotton gin from Assam

Unlike with ordinary gear trains, the direction of transmission (input shaft vs output shaft) is not reversible when using large reduction ratios. This is due to the greater friction involved between the worm and worm wheel, and is especially prevalent when a single-start (one spiral) worm is used. This can be an advantage when it is desired to eliminate any possibility of the output driving the input. If a multi-start worm (multiple spirals) is used, then the ratio reduces accordingly, and the braking effect of a worm and worm wheel may need to be discounted, as the wheel may be able to drive the worm.

Worm drive configurations in which the wheel cannot drive the worm are called self-locking. Whether a worm drive is self-locking depends on the lead angle, the pressure angle, and the coefficient of friction.

== History ==
The invention of the worm drive is attributed by some to Archimedes during the First Punic War, wherein the size of the ships being built necessitated a much larger crane than was available at the time. The crane developed for this purpose utilised a worm drive and several magnifying gears and was named the barulkon. The description of this crane was recorded in the Library of Alexandria, and subsequent engineers would draw upon Archimedes' ideas until the first technical drawings of a worm drive were developed by Leonardo da Vinci; the design was limited by the fact that metallic gears had not been invented by the advent of the 15th century, and the drive was never built in his lifetime.

It was recognized since the invention of the worm drive that it was most effective when a large gear ratio was to be used; up until the 1900s, it continued to be used for this purpose, though it found limited applications in the early development of electric motors as the drives would overheat at high shaft speeds. The modern applications of the worm drive began shortly after the introduction of more effective lubrication methods through closed gear housings.

== Applications ==
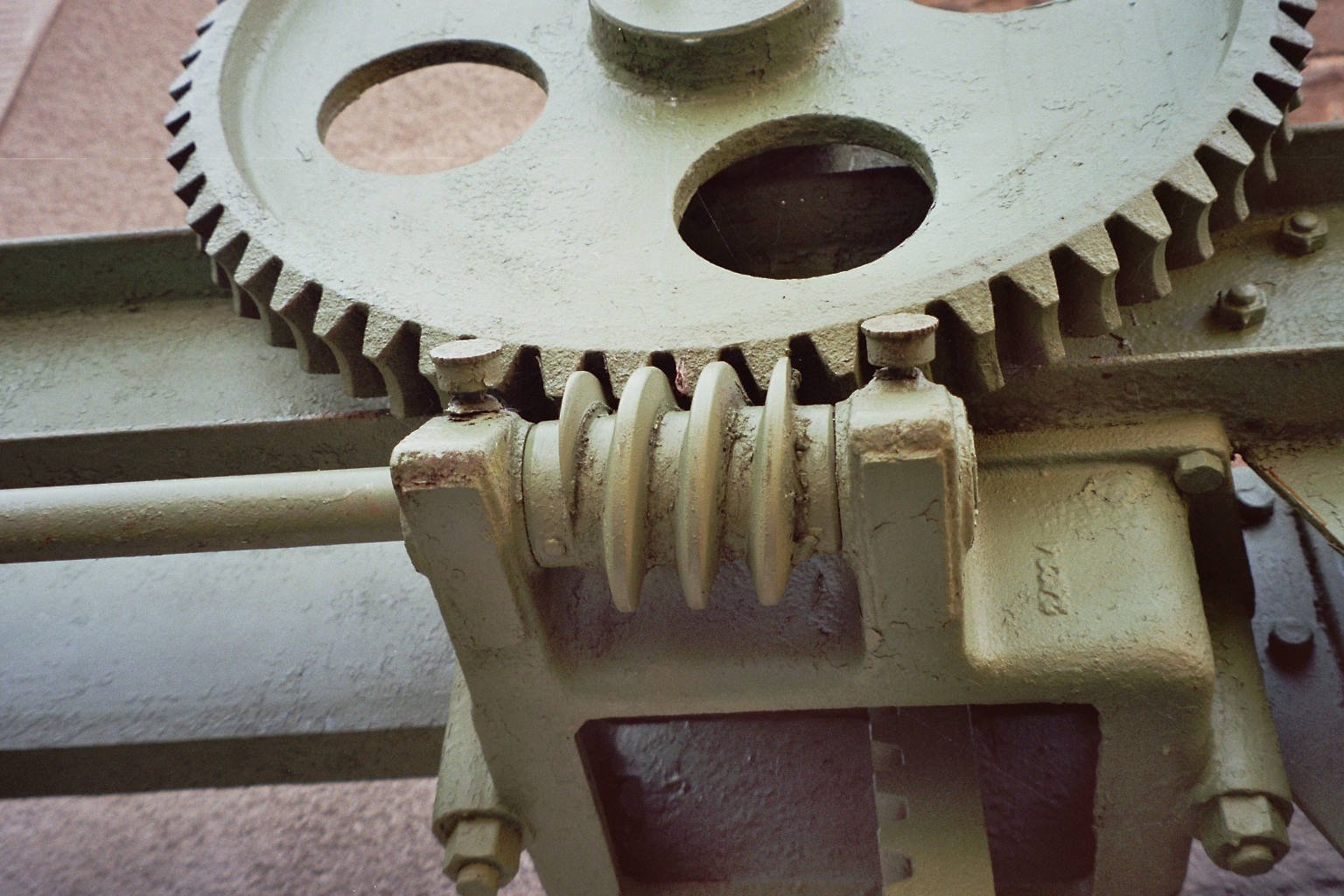
A worm drive controlling a gate. The position of the gate does not change, once set

In early 20th century automobiles prior to the introduction of power steering, the effect of a flat or blowout on one of the front wheels tended to pull the steering mechanism toward the side with the flat tire. The use of a worm drive reduced this effect. Further worm drive development led to recirculating ball bearings to reduce frictional forces, which transmitted some steering force to the wheel. This aids vehicle control, and reduces wear that could cause difficulties in steering precisely.

Worm drives are a compact means of substantially decreasing speed and increasing torque. Small electric motors are generally high-speed and low-torque; the addition of a worm drive increases the range of applications that it may be suitable for, especially when the worm drive's compactness is considered.

Worm drives are used in presses, rolling mills, conveying engineering, mining industry machines, on rudders, and circular saws. In addition, milling heads and rotary tables are positioned using high-precision duplex worm drives with adjustable backlash. Worm drives are used on many lift/elevator and escalator drive applications, due to their compact size and their non-reversibility.

In the era of sailing ships, the introduction of a worm drive to control the rudder was a significant advance. Prior to its introduction, a rope drum drive controlled the rudder. Rough seas could apply substantial force to the rudder, often requiring several men to steer the vessel—some drives had two large-diameter wheels so that up to four crewmen could operate the rudder.

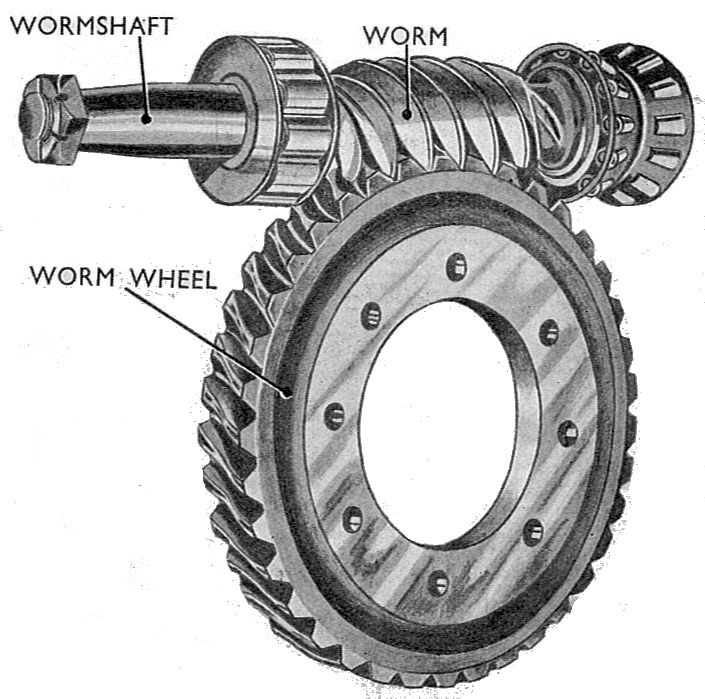
Truck final drive of the 1930s

Worm drives have been used in a few automotive rear-axle final drives (though not the differential itself). They took advantage of the location of the worm being at either the very top or very bottom of the differential crown wheel. In the 1910s, they were common on trucks; to gain the most clearance on muddy roads, the worm was placed on top. In the 1920s, the Stutz firm used them on its cars; to have a lower floor than its competitors, the worm was located on the bottom. An example circa 1960 was the Peugeot 404. The worm drive protects the vehicle against rollback. This ability has largely fallen from favour, due to the higher-than-necessary reduction ratios.

A more recent exception to this is the Torsen differential, which uses worm wheels and planetary worms, in place of the bevel gearing of conventional open differentials. Torsen differentials are most prominently featured in the Humvee and some commercial Hummer vehicles, and as a centre differential in some all-wheel drive systems, such as Audi's quattro. Very heavy trucks, such as those used to carry aggregates, often use a worm drive differential for strength. The worm drive is not as efficient as a hypoid gear, and such trucks invariably have a very large differential housing, with a correspondingly large volume of gear oil, to absorb and dissipate the heat created.

Worm drives are used as the tuning mechanism for many musical instruments, including guitars, double basses, mandolins, bouzoukis, and many banjos (although most high-end banjos use planetary gears or friction pegs). A worm drive tuning device is called a machine head.

Plastic worm drives are often used on small battery-operated electric motors, to provide an output with a lower angular velocity (fewer revolutions per minute) than that of the motor, which operates best at a fairly high speed, in addition to being quieter than a drive with metal gears. This motor-worm-drive system is often used in toys and other small electrical devices.

A worm drive is used on Jubilee-type hose clamps or Jubilee clamps. The tightening screw's worm thread engages with the slots on the clamp band.

Occasionally a worm drive is designed to run in reverse, resulting in the worm shaft turning much faster than the input. Examples of this may be seen in some hand-cranked centrifuges, blacksmithing forge blower, or the wind governor in a musical box.

A multi-start worm drive driven in reverse to power a hand-crank blower

== Left-hand and right-hand worm ==
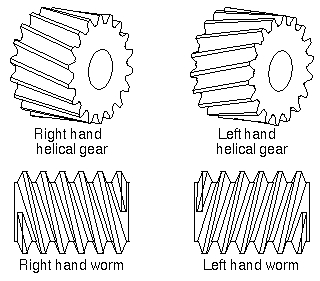
Helical and worm handedness

A right-hand helical gear or right-hand worm is one in which the teeth twist clockwise as they recede from an observer looking along the axis. The designations, right-hand and left-hand, are the same as in the long-established practice for screw threads, both external and internal. Two external helical gears operating on parallel axes must be of opposite hand. An internal helical gear and its pinion must be of the same hand.

A left-hand helical gear or left-hand worm is one in which the teeth twist anticlockwise as they recede from an observer looking along the axis.

== Manufacture ==
Worm wheels are typically manufactured in several stages to achieve the required tooth geometry and surface quality. The process usually begins with gashing, a rough machining operation in which deep slots are cut into the gear blank to remove the bulk of the material that will eventually form the tooth spaces. This preliminary operation significantly reduces the amount of material that must be removed during the finishing stage.

The gashing process is generally performed using milling cutters or special gashing tools designed to produce tooth spaces that closely approximate the final geometry. Depending on the size and specification of the worm wheel, several passes may be required. The teeth are commonly left with a machining allowance of up to 5 mm, providing sufficient material for subsequent finishing operations while ensuring that the final dimensions can be achieved accurately.

If the gashing operation is carried out with sufficient precision, the subsequent hobbing process can often be performed without the need for specially shaped finishing tools. During hobbing, a worm-shaped cutting tool progressively generates the final tooth profile by means of a continuous indexing action between the hob and the gear blank. Because much of the material has already been removed during gashing, the cutting loads on the hob are reduced, resulting in lower tool wear, improved dimensional accuracy, and shorter machining times.

After several roughing passes and a final hobbing operation, the worm wheel attains its finished tooth geometry and is then inspected to verify parameters such as tooth profile accuracy, pitch, and surface finish before being approved for service.

== See also ==
- List of gear nomenclature
- Gear
- Linear actuator, some forms occasionally also referred to as worm gear or worm drive
- Rack and pinion
- Slewing drive
