= Indexing (motion) =

Indexing in reference to motion is moving (or being moved) into a new position or location quickly and easily but also precisely. When indexing a machine part, its new location is known to within a few hundredths of a millimeter (thousandths of an inch) or better, despite the fact that no new elaborate measuring or layout was needed to establish that location. In reference to multi-edge cutting inserts, indexing is the process of exposing a new cutting edge for use. Indexing is a necessary kind of motion in many areas of mechanical engineering and machining. An object that indexes, or can be indexed, is said to be indexable.

Usually when the word indexing is used, it refers specifically to rotation. That is, indexing is most often the quick and easy but precise rotation of a machine part through a certain known number of degrees. For example, Machinery's Handbook, 25th edition, in its section on milling machine indexing, says, "Positioning a workpiece at a precise angle or interval of rotation for a machining operation is called indexing." In addition to that most classic sense of the word, the swapping of one part for another, or other controlled movements, are also sometimes referred to as indexing, even if rotation is not the focus.

== Examples from everyday life ==
There are various examples of indexing that laypersons (non-engineers and non-machinists) can find in everyday life. These motions are not always called by the name indexing, but the idea is essentially similar:

- The motion of a retractable utility knife blade, which often will have well-defined discrete positions (fully retracted, ¼-exposed, ½-exposed, ¾-exposed, fully exposed)
- The indexing of a revolver's cylinder with each shot

== Manufacturing applications ==
Indexing is vital in manufacturing, especially mass production, where a well-defined cycle of motions must be repeated quickly and easily—but precisely—for each interchangeable part that is made. Without indexing capability, all manufacturing would have to be done on a craft basis, and interchangeable parts would have very high unit cost because of the time and skill needed to produce each unit. In fact, the evolution of modern technologies depended on the shift in methods from crafts (in which toolpath is controlled via operator skill) to indexing-capable toolpath control. A prime example of this theme was the development of the turret lathe, whose turret indexes tool positions, one after another, to allow successive tools to move into place, take precisely placed cuts, then make way for the next tool.

=== How indexing is achieved in manufacturing ===
Indexing capability is provided in two fundamental ways: with or without Information technology (IT).

==== Non-IT-assisted physical guidance ====
Non-IT-assisted physical guidance was the first means of providing indexing capability, via purely mechanical means. It allowed the Industrial Revolution to progress into the Machine Age. It is achieved by jigs, fixtures, and machine tool parts and accessories, which control toolpath by the very nature of their shape, physically limiting the path for motion. Some archetypal examples, developed to perfection before the advent of the IT era, are drill jigs, the turrets on manual turret lathes, indexing heads for manual milling machines, rotary tables, and various indexing fixtures and blocks that are simpler and less expensive than indexing heads, and serve quite well for most indexing needs in small shops. Although indexing heads of the pre-CNC era are now mostly obsolete in commercial manufacturing, the principle of purely mechanical indexing is still a vital part of current technology, in concert with IT, even as it has been extended to newer uses, such as the indexing of CNC milling machine toolholders or of indexable cutter inserts, whose precisely controlled size and shape allows them to be rotated or replaced quickly and easily without changing overall tool geometry.

==== IT-assisted physical guidance ====
IT-assisted physical guidance (for example, via NC, CNC, or robotics) has been developed since the World War II era and uses electromechanical and electrohydraulic servomechanisms to translate digital information into position control. These systems also ultimately physically limit the path for motion, as jigs and other purely mechanical means do; but they do it not simply through their own shape, but rather using changeable information.

== See also ==
- Indexing head
- Rotary table
- Turret lathe
- Numerical control
- Computer numerical control
- Servomechanism
- Jig
- Fixture
- Machining
- Machine tool
- Indexable insert

== Bibliography ==
- Bulgin, J. Randolph (March–April 2011), "Indexing basics", The Home Shop Machinist, 30 (2), Traverse City, MI, USA: Village Press: 66–69.
- Oberg, Erik; Jones, Franklin D.; Horton, Holbrook L.; Ryffel, Henry H. (1996), Green, Robert E.; McCauley, Christopher J. (eds.), Machinery's Handbook (25th ed.), New York: Industrial Press, ISBN 978-0-8311-2575-2, OCLC 473691581.
