= Indexing head =

Dividing head

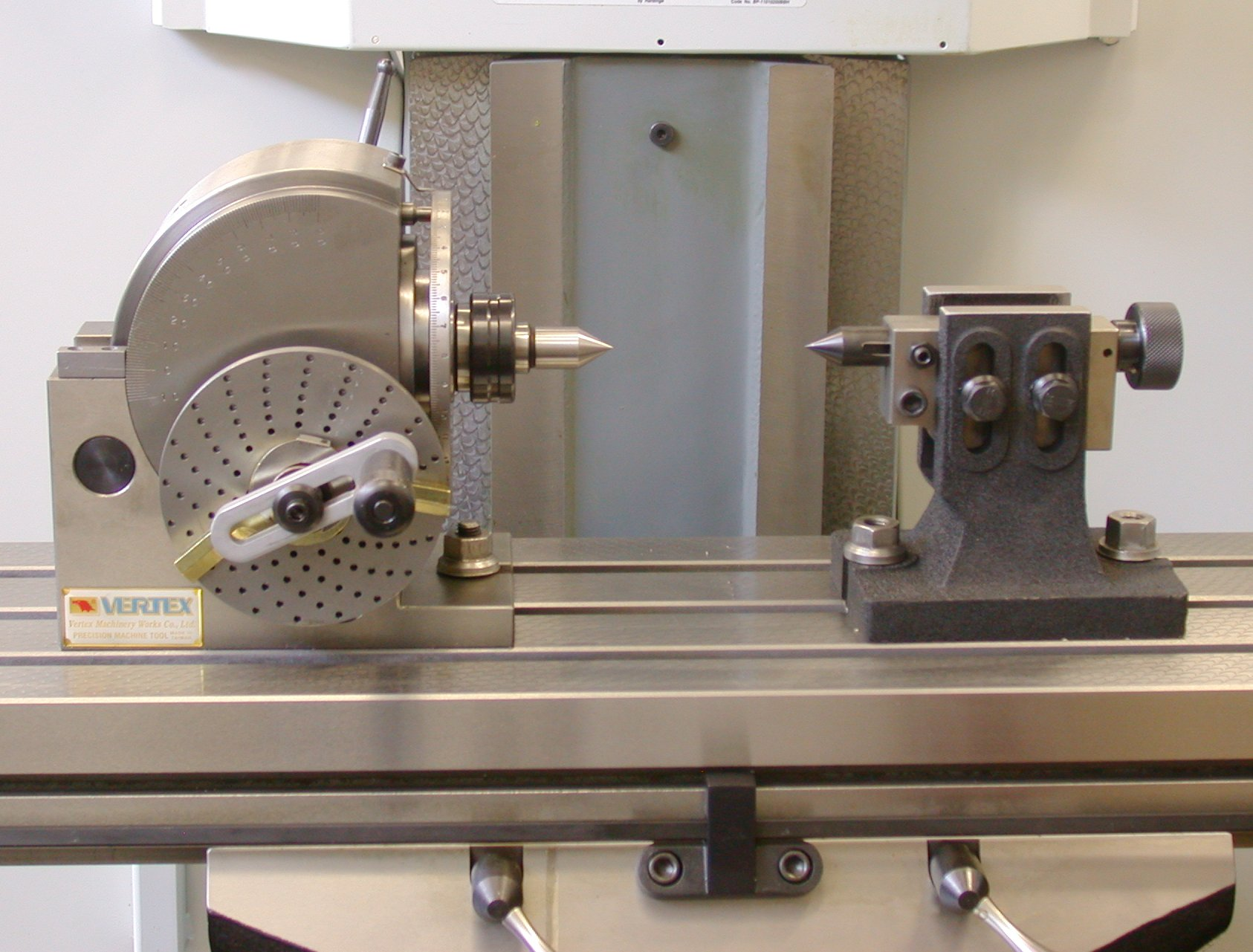
Indexing head and tailstock set up on a milling machine's table.

An indexing head, also known as a dividing head or spiral head, is a specialized tool that allows a workpiece to be circularly indexed; that is, easily and precisely rotated to preset angles or circular divisions. Indexing heads are usually used on the tables of milling machines, but may be used on many other machine tools including drill presses, grinders, and boring machines. Common jobs for a dividing head include machining the flutes of a milling cutter, cutting the teeth of a gear, milling curved slots, or drilling a bolt hole circle around the circumference of a part.

The tool is similar to a rotary table except that it is designed to be tilted as well as rotated and often allows positive locking at finer gradations of rotation, including through differential indexing. Most adjustable designs allow the head to be tilted from 10° below horizontal to 90° vertical, at which point the head is parallel with the machine table.

The workpiece is held in the indexing head in the same manner as a metalworking lathe. This is most commonly a chuck but can include a collet fitted directly into the spindle on the indexing head, faceplate, or between centers. If the part is long then it may be supported with the help of an accompanying tailstock.

== Manual indexing heads ==
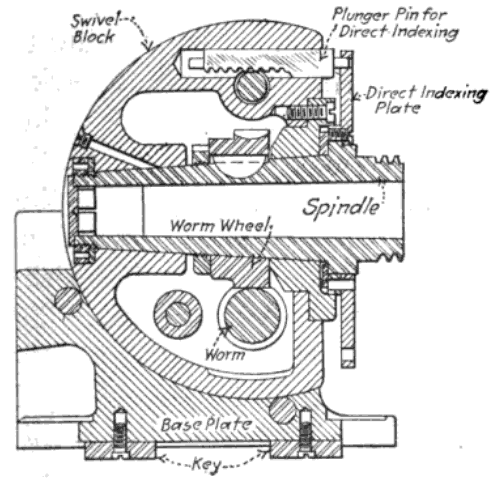
Cross-section of an indexing head

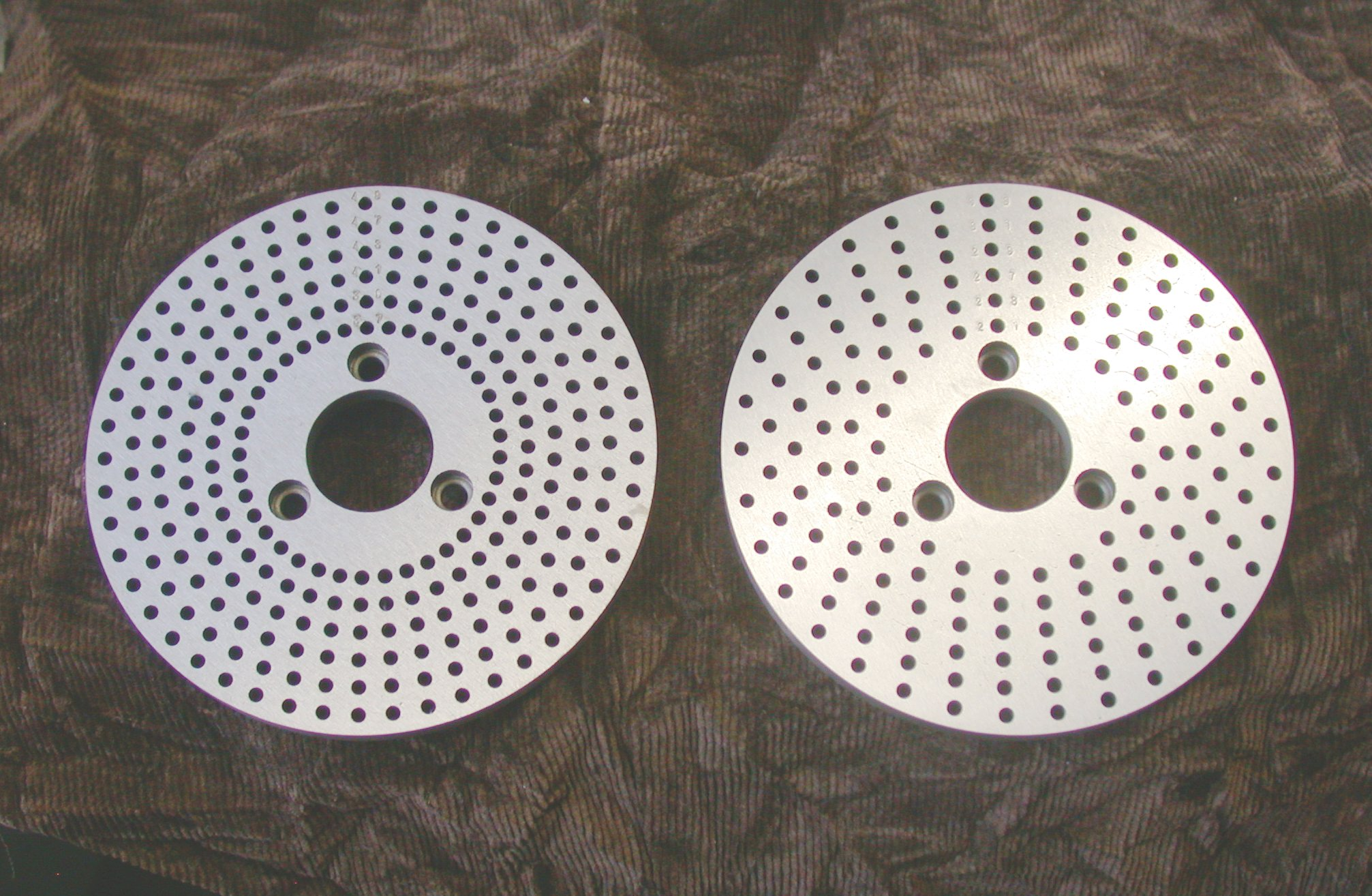
Interchangeable indexing plates

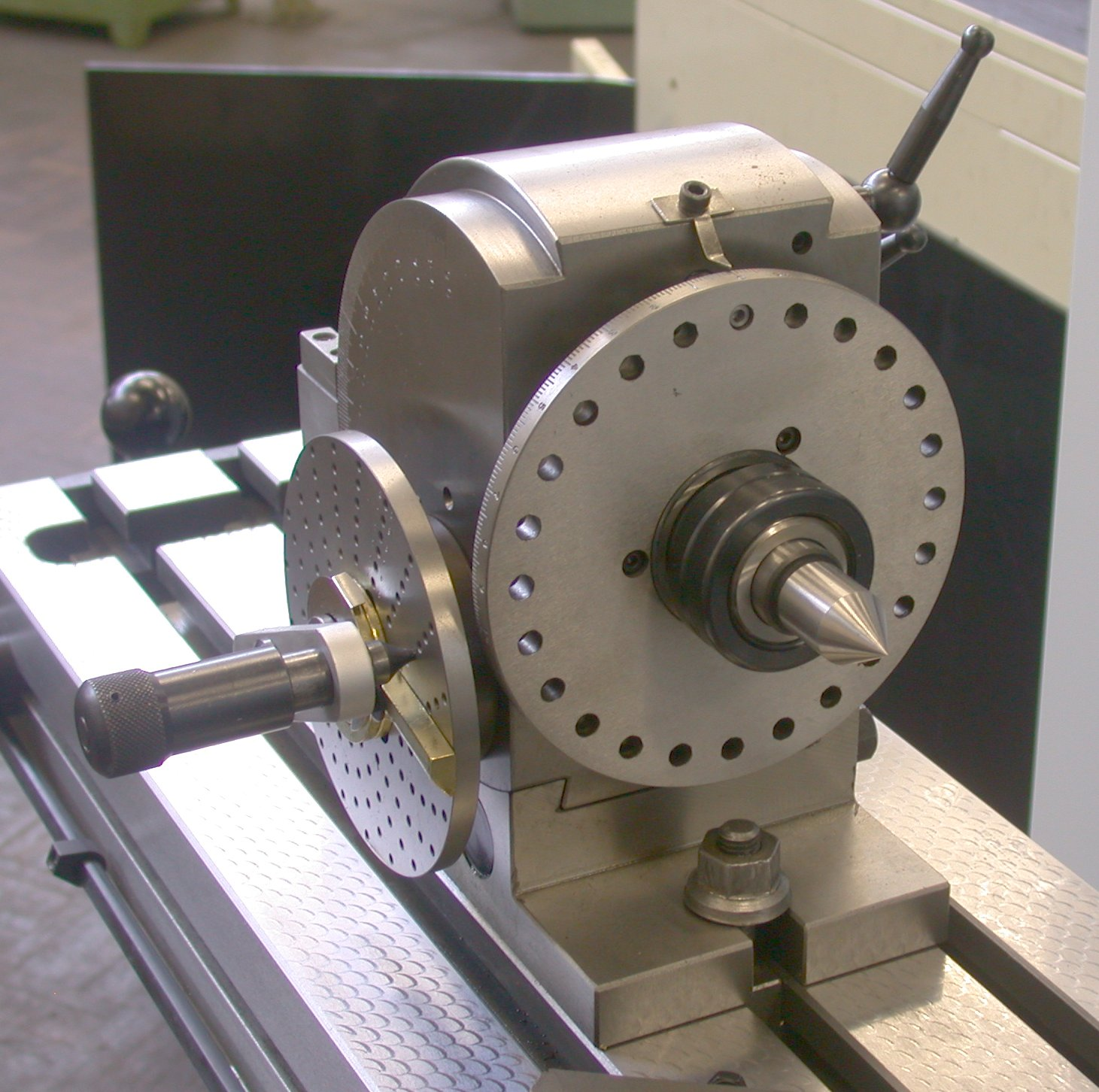
A dividing head mounted on the table of a small milling machine. The direct indexing plate and center are visible facing the camera. An interchangeable indexing plate is visible on the left side.

Indexing is an operation of dividing a periphery of a cylindrical workpiece into equal number of divisions by the help of index crank and index plate. A manual indexing head includes a hand crank. Rotating the hand crank in turn rotates the spindle and therefore the workpiece. The hand crank uses a worm gear drive to provide precise control of the rotation of the work. The work may be rotated and then locked into place before the cutter is applied, or it may be rotated during cutting depending on the type of machining being done.

Most dividing heads operate at a 40:1 ratio; that is 40 turns of the hand crank generates 1 revolution of the spindle or workpiece. In other words, 1 turn of the hand crank rotates the spindle by 9 degrees. Because the operator of the machine may want to rotate the part to an arbitrary angle indexing plates are used to ensure the part is accurately positioned.

Direct indexing plate: Most dividing heads have an indexing plate permanently attached to the spindle. This plate is located at the end of the spindle, very close to where the work would be mounted. It is fixed to the spindle and rotates with it. This plate is usually equipped with a series of holes that enables rapid indexing to common angles, such as 30, 45, or 90 degrees. A pin in the base of the dividing head can be extended into the direct indexing plate to lock the head quickly into one of these angles. The advantage of the direct indexing plate is that it is fast and simple, and no calculations are required to use it. The disadvantage is that it can only be used for a limited number of angles.

In high-precision manual and CNC indexing heads, a Hirth joint is frequently used to provide positive locking and precise angular alignment. This mechanism is preferred over friction-based locks because its straight-tooth geometry ensures exceptional static stiffness and positional repeatability, allowing the workpiece to withstand heavy cutting forces without angular displacement.

Interchangeable indexing plates are used when the work must be rotated to an angle not available on the direct indexing plate. Because the hand crank is fixed to the spindle at a known ratio (commonly 40:1) the dividing plates mounted at the handwheel can be used to create finer divisions for precise orientation at irregular angles. These dividing plates are provided in sets of several plates. Each plate has rings of holes with different divisions. For example, an indexing plate might have three rows of holes with 24, 30, and 36 holes in each row. A pin on the hand crank engages these holes. Index plates with up to 400 holes are available. Only one such plate can be mounted to the dividing head at a time. The plate is selected by the machinist based on exactly what angle he wishes to index to.

For example, if a machinist wanted to index (rotate) his workpiece by 22.5 degrees, then he would turn the hand crank two full revolutions plus one-half of a turn. Since each full revolution is 9 degrees and a half-revolution is 4.5 degrees, the total is 22.5 (9 + 9 + 4.5 = 22.5). The one-half turn can easily be done precisely using any indexing plate with an even number of holes and rotating to the halfway point (Hole #8 on the 16-hole ring).

Brown and Sharpe indexing heads include a set of 3 indexing plates. The plates are marked #1, #2 and #3, or "A", "B" and "C". Each plate contains 6 rows of holes. Plate #1 or "A" has 15, 16, 17, 18, 19, and 20 holes. Plate #2 or "B" has 21, 23, 27, 29, 31, and 33 holes. Plate #3 or "C" has 37, 39, 41, 43, 47, and 49 holes.

Universal Dividing heads: some manual indexing heads are equipped with a power drive provision. This allows the rotation of the dividing head to be connected to the table feed of the milling machine instead of using a hand crank. A set of change gears is provided to select the ratio between the table feed and rotation. This setup allows the machining of spiral or helical features such as spiral gears, worms, or screw type parts because the part is simultaneously rotated at the same time it is moved in the horizontal direction. This setup is called a " PTO dividing head".

== CNC indexing heads ==
CNC indexing heads are similar in design to the manual variety, except that they have a servo motor coupled to the spindle instead of a hand crank and indexing plates. The servo motor is electronically controlled to index the work to the required position. The control can either be a simple keypad for the operator, or it may be fully CNC controlled.

CNC indexing heads may be controlled in two different modes. The most basic method of operation uses simple control functions built into the dividing head. It does not require a CNC machine. The operator enters the desired angle into a control box attached to the indexing head, and it automatically rotates to the desired position and locks into place for machining. Changing angles is as simple as typing a new angle value onto the control pad. This is simpler than setting up a manual indexing head because there is no need to interchange indexing plates or to calculate which hole positions to use. It is also faster for repetitive operations because the work can be indexed by simply pressing a button, eliminating the need to count rotations of the hand crank or specific hole positions on the indexing plate. A CNC dividing head may be used in this manner on either manual or CNC machinery.

Most CNC dividing heads are also able to function as a full CNC axis and may be wired into the control of a CNC machine. This enables the machine's main CNC controller to control the indexing head just like it would control the other axes of the machine. This can be used to machine complex 3D shapes, helices with a non-constant pitch, and similar exotic parts. This mode of operation cannot be used on a manual machine tool because it requires a full CNC controller to operate.
