= Rotary table =

Tool used in metalworking

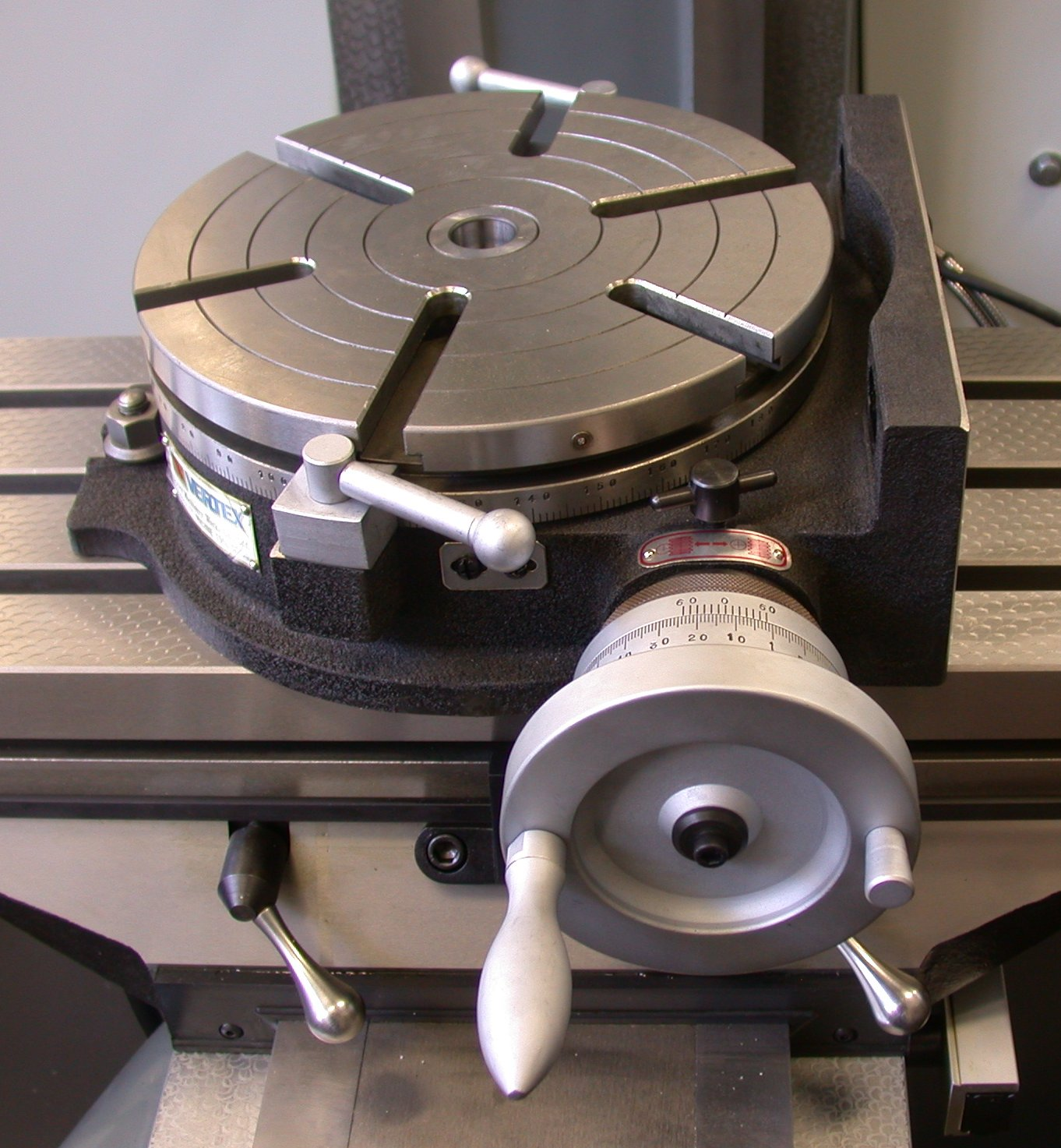
254 mm (10 inch), manual rotary table

A rotary table is a precision work positioning device used in metalworking. It enables the operator to drill or cut work at exact intervals around a fixed (usually horizontal or vertical) axis. Some rotary tables allow the use of index plates for indexing operations, and some can also be fitted with dividing plates that enable regular work positioning at divisions for which indexing plates are not available. A rotary fixture used in this fashion is more appropriately called a dividing head (indexing head).

== Construction ==
The table shown is a manually operated type. Powered tables under the control of CNC machines are now available, and provide a fourth axis to CNC milling machines. Rotary tables are made with a solid base, which has provision for clamping onto another table or fixture. The actual table is a precision-machined disc to which the work piece is clamped (T slots are generally provided for this purpose). This disc can rotate freely, for indexing, or under the control of a worm (handwheel), with the worm wheel portion being made part of the actual table. High precision tables are driven by backlash compensating duplex worms.

The ratio between worm and table is generally 40:1, 72:1 or 90:1 but may be any ratio that can be easily divided exactly into 360°. This is for ease of use when indexing plates are available. A graduated dial and, often, a vernier scale enable the operator to position the table, and thus the work affixed to it with great accuracy.

A through hole is usually machined into the table. Most commonly, this hole is machined to admit a Morse taper center or fixture.

== Use ==
Rotary tables are most commonly mounted "flat", with the table rotating around a vertical axis, in the same plane as the cutter of a vertical milling machine. An alternate setup is to mount the rotary table on its end (or mount it "flat" on a 90° angle plate), so that it rotates about a horizontal axis. In this configuration a tailstock can also be used, thus holding the workpiece "between centers."

With the table mounted on a secondary table, the workpiece is accurately centered on the rotary table's axis, which in turn is centered on the cutting tool's axis. All three axes are thus coaxial. From this point, the secondary table can be offset in either the X or Y direction to set the cutter the desired distance from the workpiece's center. This allows concentric machining operations on the workpiece. Placing the workpiece eccentrically a set distance from the center permits more complex curves to be cut. As with other setups on a vertical mill, the milling operation can be either drilling a series of concentric, and possibly equidistant holes, or face or end milling either circular or semicircular shapes and contours.

A rotary table can be used:

- To machine spanner flats on a bolt
- To drill equidistant holes on a circular flange
- To cut a round piece with a protruding tang
- To create large-diameter holes, via milling in a circular toolpath, on small milling machines that don't have the power to drive large twist drills (over 0.500 inch or 13 mm)
- To mill helixes
- To cut complex curves (with proper setup)
- to cut straight lines at any angle
- to cut arcs
- with the addition of a compound table on top of the rotary table, the user can move the center of rotation to anywhere on the part being cut. This enables an arc to be cut at any place on the part.
- to cut circular pieces

Additionally, if converted to stepper motor operation, with a CNC milling machine and a tailstock, a rotary table allows many parts to be made on a mill that otherwise would require a lathe.

== Applications ==
Rotary tables have many applications, including being used in the manufacture and inspection process of important elements in aerospace, automation and scientific industries. The use of rotary tables stretches as far as the film and animation industry, being used to obtain accuracy and precision in filming and photography.

To achieve the required micron-level accuracy, high-precision rotary tables often incorporate a Hirth joint. This mechanism is preferred in heavy-duty machining because its straight-tooth geometry provides exceptional static stiffness and positional repeatability, ensuring the table remains stable and locked under significant cutting loads.
