= Hose clamp =

Device used to attach and seal a hose onto a fitting

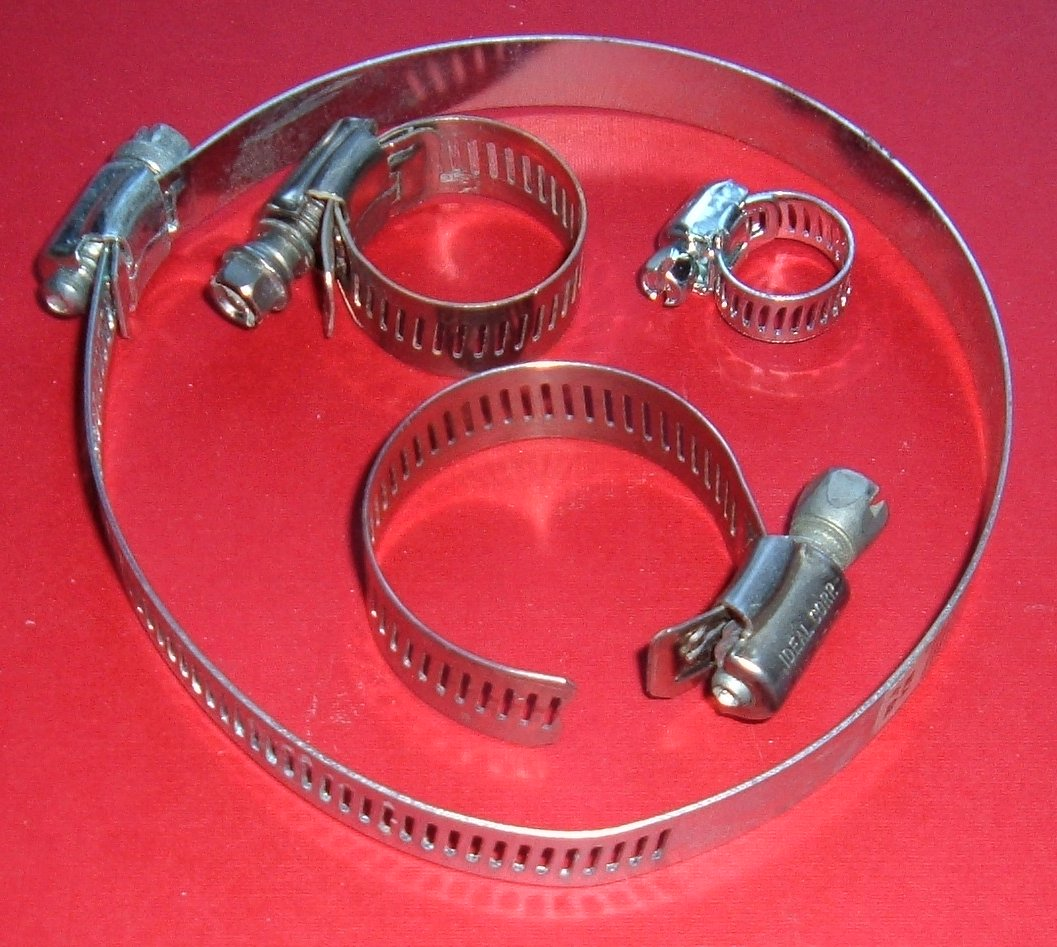
Screw/band hose clamps.

A hose clamp is a device used to attach and seal a hose onto a fitting such as a barb or nipple.

== Materials ==
The core range of hose clamps on the open market are made from materials like stainless steel, which come in varying standards such as 304 (W4), 316 (W5) and 430 (W3). Stainless steel is classified into various grades based on its composition and properties, which are crucial for applications such as hose clamps. Hose clamps also come in W1 (zinc-plated steel) and mixed materials like zinc-plated & 430SS (W5). More modern iterations of the hose clamp include sees them being manufactured from polymer, which includes materials specifications such as nylon 66 (PA66) or polypropylene (PP) and nylon 12 (PA12).

== Types ==
Many types are available, including :

=== Screw/band (worm gear) clamps ===
Screw clamps consist of a band, often galvanized or stainless steel, into which a screw thread pattern has been cut or pressed. One end of the band contains a captive screw. The clamp is put around the hose or tube to be connected, with the loose end being fed into a narrow space between the band and the captive screw. When the screw is turned, it acts as a worm drive pulling the threads of the band, causing the band to tighten around the hose (or when screwed the opposite direction, to loosen). Screw clamps are normally used for hoses 1/2 inch diameter and up, with other clamps used for smaller hoses.

The first patent for a worm-drive hose clamp was granted to Swedish inventor Knut Edwin Bergström in 1896 Bergström founded “Allmänna Brandredskapsaffären E. Bergström & Co.” in 1896 (ABA) to manufacture these worm gear clamps.

Other names for the worm gear hose clamp include worm drive clamp, worm gear clips, clamps, band clamps, hose clips, and genericized names such as Jubilee Clip.

Many public organizations maintain hose clamp standards, such as Aerospace Industries Association's National Aerospace Standards NAS1922 and NAS1924, the Society of Automotive Engineers' J1508, etc.

Pairs of screw clamps on a short rubber tube form a "no-hub band," often used for attaching sections of domestic wastewater piping, or used for other pipes as a flexible coupler (to fix alignment difficulties or to prevent pipe breakage due to relative movement of sections) or an emergency repair.

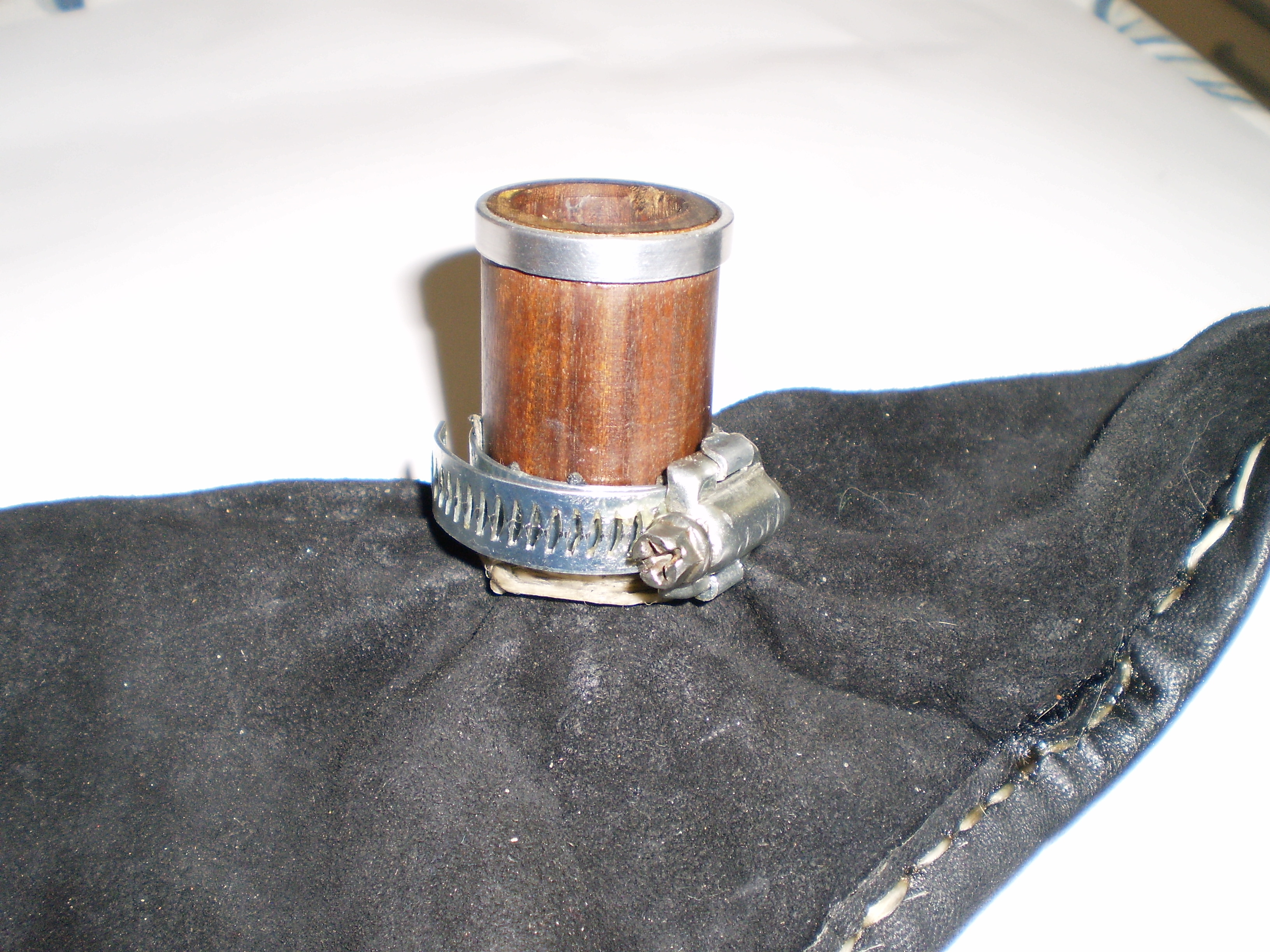
A hose clamp used to hold the leather in place while tying-in the bag of bagpipes.

They can also be used in a similar way, as a simple means for the transmission of small amounts of power. A short length of hose is clipped between two shafts where vibration or variations in alignment may be taken up by the flexibility of the hose. This technique is well adapted to use for mock-ups in a development laboratory.

This type of clamp was marketed in 1921 by ex Royal Navy Commander, Lumley Robinson, who founded L. Robinson & Co (Gillingham) Ltd., a business in Gillingham, Kent. The company owns the trademark for Jubilee Clip.

Similar types of clamps for hoses include the Marman clamp, which also has a screw band and a solid screw.

Interlocking plastic clamps, where the large fin clip base is designed for overlocking and interlocking the jaw to the required tightness.

T clamps are designed for high pressure pipes and hoses such as turbo pressure hoses and coolant hoses for high pressure engines. These clamps have a small grub screw that pulls the two halves of the clamp together to securely fasten heavy duty hoses.

=== Spring clamps ===
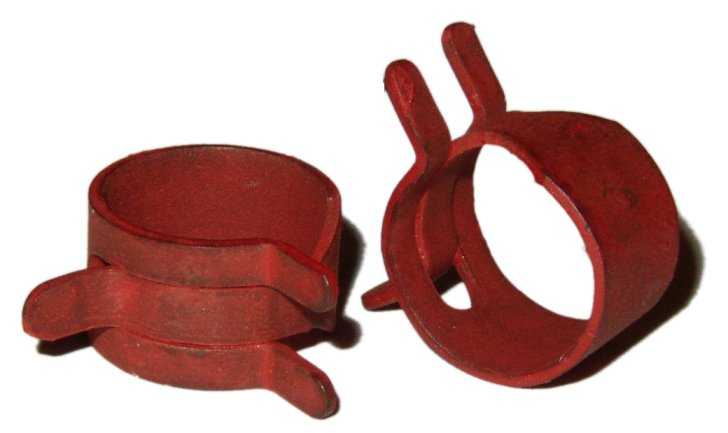
A pair of spring clamps, intended for use on automotive fuel lines

Spring clamps are typically made from a strip of spring steel, cut so that one side has a narrow protrusion centered on the end, and the other side a pair of narrow protrusions on either side. The ends of these protrusions are then bent outwards, and the strip rolled to form a ring, with the protruding tabs intermeshing. To use the clamp, the exposed tabs are pressed towards each other (typically using pliers), increasing the diameter of the ring, and the clamp is slid onto the hose, past the portion that will go onto the barb. The hose is then fit onto the barb, the clamp expanded again, slid onto the portion of the hose over the barb, then released, compressing the hose onto the barb. Clamps of this design are rarely used for high pressures or large hoses, as they would require unwieldy amounts of steel to generate enough clamping force, and be impossible to work with using just hand tools. They are commonly used on automotive cooling system hoses several inches in diameter, for example on most water-cooled Volkswagen automobiles.

Spring clamps are particularly suited for confined or otherwise awkward places where other clip types would require tightening tools applied from narrow and possibly inaccessible angles. This has made them particularly popular for applications such as automotive engine bays and for securing barb connections in PC water-cooling.

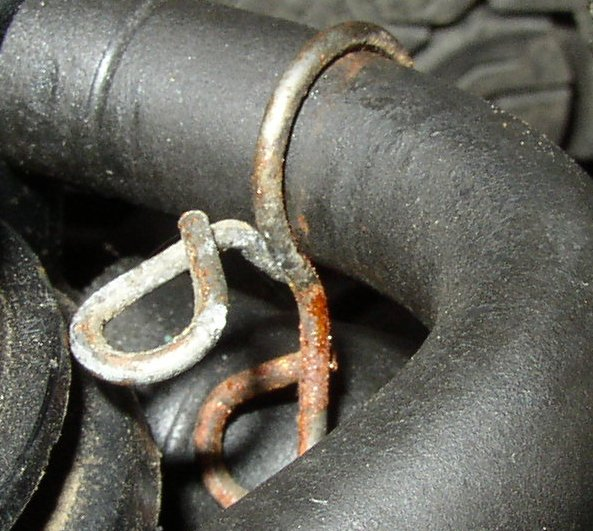
A simple spring clamp, used on an automotive vacuum hose

Another type of spring clamp, typically only used on vacuum hoses, is just a piece of spring steel wire bent into a loop, with the ends curled to provide handles. These are used similar to standard spring clamps, but are just pinched by hand, and provide very little clamping force. Rather than attempting to seal a hose into a barb, they just place a slight pressure on the hose, helping to keep it from sliding off the barb.

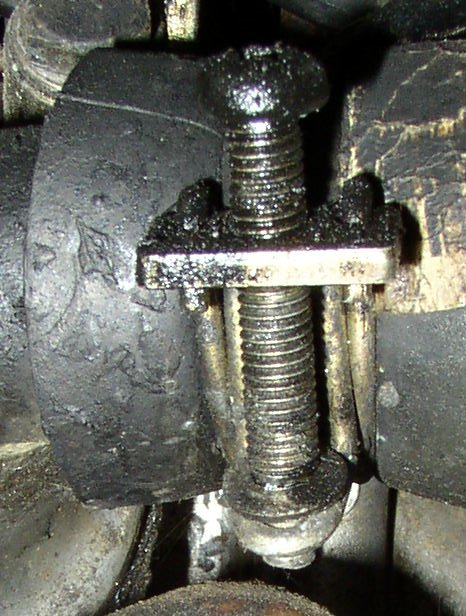
A (somewhat dirty and overtightened) wire clamp, used on an automotive radiator

=== Wire clamps ===
Wire clamps consist of a piece of heavy wire, typically made of steel, first bent into a tight U, then formed into a ring shape with one end overlapping the other, and finally the ends bent outwards and cut. A captive nut is attached to one end, and a captive screw is attached to the other end. When the screw is tightened, the overlapped ends of the wire are pushed apart, tightening the wire loop around the hose. For an explanation of why this design is used, see the section on sealing the connection.

=== Ear clamps ===
Ear clamps consist of a band (usually stainless steel) into which one or more “ears” or closing elements have been formed. The clamp is placed over the end of the hose or tube to be connected and when each ear is closed at the base of the ear with a special pincer tool, it permanently deforms, pulling the band, and causing the band to tighten around the hose. The size of clamp should be chosen such that the ear(s) are almost completely closed on installation.

Other features of this style of clamp include: narrow band widths, intended to provide a concentrated compression of the hose or tube; and tamper resistance, due to the permanent deformation of the clamp’s “ear”. If closure of the clamp “ear(s)” is performed to manufacturer's recommendations, which generally provide for constant jaw force, the sealing effect is not unduly sensitive to component tolerance variations. It is possible to remove an ear clamp by using pliers to unbend the ear.

Some such clamps feature dimples intended to provide a spring effect when the diameter of the hose or tube contracts or expands due to thermal or mechanical effects.

A stepless type of ear clamp was invented by Hans Oetiker in Horgen, Switzerland, which eliminates steps or gaps on the inner circumference of the clamp. This is said to provide uniform compression and a 360° seal. Such stepless clamps are claimed to be well suited to applications involving thin-walled hoses, supposedly with higher retained loads. This suggests they should be considered for difficult to seal applications such as molded plastics or other less malleable materials, commonly used in the automotive industry.

=== Other methods ===
Many other methods can be used to attach hoses or tubing, such as compression fittings (where a nylon or soft metal ferrule is compressed onto the hose by the tightening of the fitting), push-fit fittings (where the hose is inserted inside of a compression sleeve, designed such that force against the hose causes the sleeve to tighten), swage fittings (where a stiff collar is compressed onto the hose), clamp fittings (where two blocks are tightened onto the sides of the hose, often found on garden hoses), crimp banding (similar to worm gear banding but a crimp is used instead of a screw/thread), and a multitude of others. However, these devices are not typically referred to as hose clamps.

== Uses and applications ==
Hose clamps are typically limited to moderate pressures, such as those found in automotive and home applications. At high pressures, especially with large hose sizes, the clamp would have to be unwieldy to be able to withstand the forces expanding it without allowing the hose to slide off the barb or a leak to form. For these high pressure applications, compression fittings, thick crimp fittings, or other designs are normally used.

Hose clamps are frequently used for things other than their intended use, and are often used as a more permanent version of duct tape wherever a tightening band around something would be useful. The screw band type in particular is very strong, and is used for non-plumbing purposes far more than the other types. These clamps can be found doing everything from mounting signs to holding together emergency (or otherwise) home repairs.

Another handy attribute: worm-drive hose clamps can be daisy-chained or "siamesed" to make a long clamp, if you have several, shorter than the job requires.

Some things seen assembled with hose clamps include the tail boom on a GMP Cricket model helicopter, a homemade gas scooter, makeshift pipe hangers, mounts for rooftop TV and shortwave antennas, and virtually every imaginable automobile body component.

Hose clamps are commonly used in the agriculture industry as well. They are used on Anhydrous Ammonia hoses and are made from a combination of steel and iron. Anhydrous ammonia hose clamps are often cadmium plated to prevent rust and corrosion.

== Sealing and mechanical strength ==
One of the fundamental goals of most hose clamps is to ensure a tight seal between the hose and the barb, preventing the working fluid from escaping. To this goal, they are designed to provide even pressure on all sides, with no gaps. An example of this would be wire clamps. An obvious design would seem to be simply having a wire around the hose, one end attached to a nut, and the other end to the screw, and when tightened, pulling the ends of the wire towards each other. However, this will leave a gap where no pressure is applied (underneath the screw), and cause a leak. To combat this, the more complicated and weaker design of having the ends overlap and then be pushed apart from each other is used, as this ensures pressure around the entire circumference of the hose.

To ensure a good seal, the barb, hose nipple, or beaded tube must be smooth and free of nicks, scratches, or contamination. Stuck hoses should never be removed by slitting them, as this can leave a scratch on the fitting which will cause a leak.

The other goal of a hose clamp is to provide mechanical attachment keeping the hose attached to a barb, hose nipple, or tube. To do this the clamp is typically placed on the hose behind the first ramp of the barb or behind the raised area near the end of and completely around the circumference of the hose nipple or tube called a bead. If the hose were to slide the clamp would have to expand to fit over the barb or raised bead. This keeps the hose attached to the barb, hose nipple, or beaded tube.

== Specifications ==
Within the United States, SAE International maintains Specification J1508 for thirty-two different hose clamp designs, including screw, spring, and t-bolt styles. It also maintains Specification J1610 for the testing the sealing of hoses. The US Army TACOM maintains Commercial Item Description (CID) A-A-52506 that provides for the standardized acquisition of hose clamps by the Department of Defense; the CID references the SAE specifications. The CID superseded Federal Specification WW-C-440 for hose clamps in 1994.
