= Hardening (metallurgy) =

Metalworking process

Hardening is a metallurgical metalworking process used to increase the hardness of a metal. The hardness of a metal is directly proportional to the uniaxial yield stress at the location of the imposed strain. A harder metal will have a higher resistance to plastic deformation than a less hard metal.

== Processes ==
The five hardening processes are:

- The Hall–Petch method, or grain boundary strengthening, is to obtain small grains. Smaller grains increases the likelihood of dislocations running into grain boundaries after shorter distances, which are very strong dislocation barriers. In general, smaller grain size will make the material harder. When the grain size approach sub-micron sizes, some materials may however become softer. This is simply an effect of another deformation mechanism that becomes easier, i.e. grain boundary sliding. At this point, all dislocation related hardening mechanisms become irrelevant.
- In work hardening (also referred to as strain hardening) the material is strained past its yield point, e.g. by cold working. Ductile metal becomes harder and stronger as it's physically deformed. The plastic straining generates new dislocations. As the dislocation density increases, further dislocation movement becomes more difficult since they hinder each other, which means the material hardness increases.
- In solid solution strengthening, a soluble alloying element is added to the material desired to be strengthened, and together they form a “solid solution”. A solid solution can be thought of just as a "normal" liquid solution, e.g. salt in water, except it is solid. Depending on the size of the dissolved alloying element's ion compared to that of the matrix-metal, it is dissolved either substitutionally (large alloying element substituting for an atom in the crystal) or interstitially (small alloying element taking a place between atoms in the crystal lattice). In both cases, the size difference of the foreign elements make them act as sand grains in sandpaper, resisting dislocations that try to slip by, resulting in higher material strength. In solution hardening, the alloying element does not precipitate from solution.
- Precipitation hardening (also called age hardening) is a process where a second phase that begins in solid solution with the matrix metal is precipitated out of solution with the metal as it is quenched, leaving particles of that phase distributed throughout to cause resistance to slip dislocations. This is achieved by first heating the metal to a temperature where the elements forming the particles are soluble then quenching it, trapping them in a solid solution. Had it been a liquid solution, the elements would form precipitates, just as supersaturated saltwater would precipitate small salt crystals, but atom diffusion in a solid is very slow at room temperature. A second heat treatment at a suitable temperature is then required to age the material. The elevated temperature allows the dissolved elements to diffuse much faster, and form the desired precipitated particles. The quenching is required since the material otherwise would start the precipitation already during the slow cooling. This type of precipitation results in few large particles rather than the, generally desired, profusion of small precipitates. Precipitation hardening is one of the most commonly used techniques for the hardening of metal alloys.
- Martensitic transformation, more commonly known as quenching and tempering, is a hardening mechanism specific for steel. The steel must be heated to a temperature where the iron phase changes from ferrite into austenite, i.e. changes crystal structure from BCC (body-centered cubic) to FCC (face-centered cubic). In austenitic form, steel can dissolve a lot more carbon. Once the carbon has been dissolved, the material is then quenched. It is important to quench with a high cooling rate so that the carbon does not have time to form precipitates of carbides. When the temperature is low enough, the steel tries to return to the low temperature crystal structure BCC. This change is very quick since it does not rely on diffusion and is called a martensitic transformation. Because of the extreme supersaturation of solid solution carbon, the crystal lattice becomes BCT (body-centered tetragonal) instead. This phase is called martensite, and is extremely hard due to a combined effect of the distorted crystal structure and the extreme solid solution strengthening, both mechanisms of which resist slip dislocation.

All hardening mechanisms introduce crystal lattice defects that act as barriers to dislocation slip.

== Applications ==
Material hardening is required for many applications:

- Machine cutting tools (drill bits, taps, lathe tools) need be much harder than the material they are operating on in order to be effective.
- Knife blades – a high hardness blade keeps a sharp edge.
- Bearings – necessary to have a very hard surface that will withstand continued stresses.
- Armor plating - High strength is extremely important both for bullet proof plates and for heavy duty containers for mining and construction.
- Anti-fatigue - Martensitic case hardening can drastically improve the service life of mechanical components with repeated loading/unloading, such as axles and cogs.
