= Wuest type herringbone gear =

Comparison between a standard and Wuest herringbone gear

A Wuest type herringbone gear, invented by Swiss engineer Caspar Wüst-Kunz in the early 20th century, is a type of herringbone gear wherein "the teeth on opposite sides of the center line are staggered by an amount equal to one half the circular pitch". This staggering of the two rows of teeth causes the gear to wear more evenly, at the slight cost of strength.
