= Herringbone pattern =

Zigzagging chevron pattern

Parallel to boundary	45° rotated

Variations by ratio
2:1	3:1	~6.6:1

The herringbone pattern is an arrangement of rectangles used for floor tilings and road pavement, so named for a fancied resemblance to the bones of a fish such as a herring. The blocks can be rectangles or parallelograms. The block edge length ratios are usually 2:1, and sometimes 3:1, but need not be even ratios.

The herringbone pattern has a symmetry of wallpaper group pgg, as long as the blocks are not of different color (i.e., considering the borders alone). The pattern can be found in wallpaper, mosaics, seating, cloth and clothing (herringbone cloth), shoe tread, security printing, herringbone gears, jewellery, sculpture and elsewhere.

== Examples ==
Egyptian mats with herringbone pattern with two different colors	Salzburg, Austria pavement	Budapest, Hungary pavement	Brooklyn Nets' maple herringbone parquet floor at Barclays Center

== Related tilings ==
As a geometric tessellation, the herringbone pattern is topologically identical to the regular hexagonal tiling. This can be seen if the rectangular blocks are distorted slightly.

Parallelogram distorted	Hexagonal distorted	Hexagonal tiling

In parquetry, more casually known as flooring, herringbone patterns can be accomplished in wood, brick, and tile. Subtle alternating colors may be used to create a distinctive floor pattern, or the materials used may be the same, causing the floor to look uniform from a distance. Laying a herringbone floor is very challenging, since the multitude of small rows must be made to line up smoothly, which can be difficult in a room which is not perfectly flat. Small mistakes in a herringbone floor can be rather glaring because of the way the pattern lines up, so care must be taken.

Masonry also utilizes herringbone, often as an accent pattern on the sides of buildings and other structures. A floor or outdoor walkway made from stone or brick may be made entirely from herringbone, or herringbone stripes may be integrated into other patterns. Just like with flooring, the rows must be carefully aligned to maintain the integrity of the pattern.

== See also ==
- Herringbone cloth
- Herringbone gear
