= Herringbone gear =

Gear with mirrored helical teeth

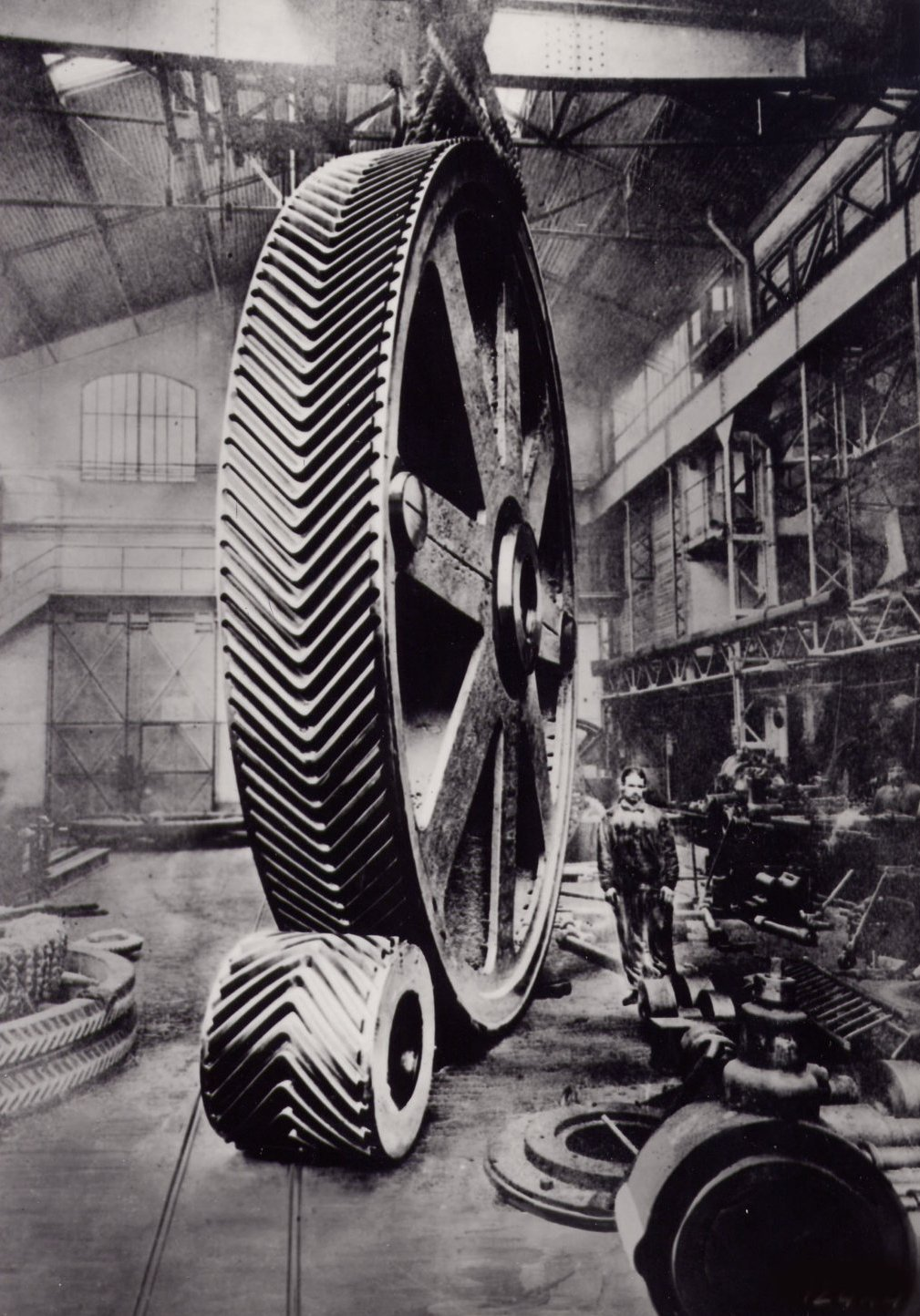

A herringbone gear, a specific type of double helical gear, is a side-to-side, rather than face-to-face, combination of two helical gears of opposite hands. From the top, each helical groove of this gear looks like the letter V, and many together form a herringbone pattern (resembling the bones of a fish such as a herring). Unlike helical gears, herringbone gears do not produce an additional axial load.

Like helical gears, they have the advantage of transferring power smoothly, because more than two teeth will be enmeshed at any moment in time. Their advantage over the helical gears is that the side-thrust of one half is balanced by that of the other half. This means that herringbone gears can be used in torque gearboxes without requiring a substantial thrust bearing. Because of this, herringbone gears were an important step in the introduction of the steam turbine to marine propulsion.

== Manufacture ==
Precision herringbone gears are more difficult to manufacture than equivalent spur or helical gears and consequently are more expensive, so typically they are used in heavy machinery.

Where the oppositely angled teeth meet in the middle of a herringbone gear, the alignment may be such that tooth tip meets tooth tip, or the alignment may be staggered, so that tooth tip meets tooth trough. The latter alignment is the unique defining characteristic of a Wuest type herringbone gear, named after its inventor Caspar Wüst-Kunz.

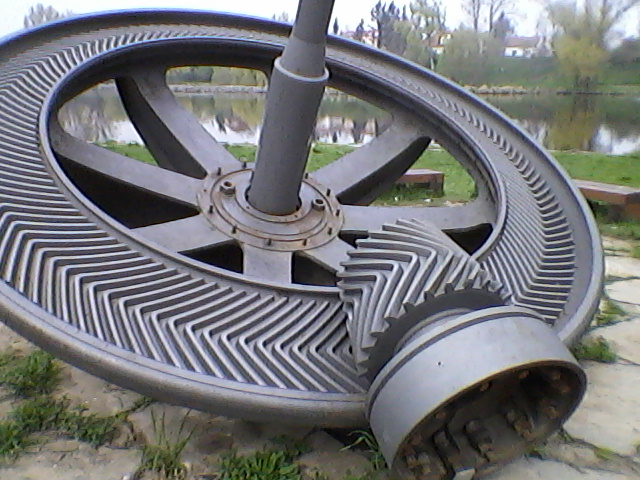
This herringbone bevel gear was made by Citroën and installed around 1927 in the small Miřejovice hydropower plant on the River Vltava in the Czech Republic, connecting a Francis turbine to the generator. It worked flawlessly until 2011.

A disadvantage of the herringbone gear is that it cannot be cut by simple gear hobbing machines, as the cutter would run into the other half of the gear. Solutions to this have included assembling small gears by stacking two helical gears together, cutting the gears with a central groove to provide clearance as per Wüst patent, and (particularly in the early days) by casting the gears to an accurate pattern and without further machining. With the first two methods of fabrication, herringbone gears had a central channel separating the two oppositely-angled courses of teeth. This was necessary to permit the shaving tool to run out of the groove.

The development of the Sykes gear shaper in the 1910s made it possible to have continuous teeth with no central gap. Sunderland, also in England, also produced a herringbone cutting machine. The Sykes uses cylindrical guides and round cutters; the Sunderland uses straight guides and rack-type cutters. The W. E. Sykes Co. dissolved in 1983–1984, since then it has been common practice to obtain an older machine and rebuild it if necessary to create this unique type of gear. Recently, the Bourn and Koch company has developed a CNC-controlled derivation of the W. E. Sykes design called the HDS1600-300. This machine, like the Sykes gear shaper, has the ability to generate a true apex without the need for a clearance groove cut around the gear. This allows the gears to be used in positive displacement pumping applications, as well as power transmission. Herringbone gears with low weight, accuracy and strength may be 3D printed.

During both World Wars marine gearboxes for naval ships were a major production bottleneck for surging warship demand, and other propulsion options like triple-expansion steam engines and diesel-electric had to be implemented for less important and slower ships like destroyer escorts.

== Citroën ==
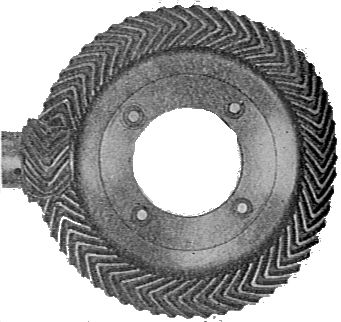
Citroën Type A final drive herringbone pinion and crownwheel

The logo of the car maker Citroën is a graphic representation of a herringbone gear, reflecting André Citroën's earlier involvement in the manufacture of these gears. Early Mors and Citroën cars used a herringbone bevel gear final drive in the rear axle.

Panhard Dyna X and successor cars (1948–1967) used double helical gears in the transaxle and for the camshaft timing gears in the engine.
