= Quench press =

Machine used to hold a quenched object

A quench press is a machine that uses concentrated forces to hold an object as it is quenched. These types of quench facilities are used to quench large gears and other circular parts so that they remain circular. They are also used to quench saw blades and other flat or plate-shaped objects so that they remain flat.

Quench presses are able to quench the part while it is being held because of the unique structure of the clamps holding the part. Clamps are slotted so that oil or water can flow through each slot and cool the part and the ribs of the clamps can hold the part in place.
