= Quenching =

Rapid cooling of a workpiece to obtain certain material properties

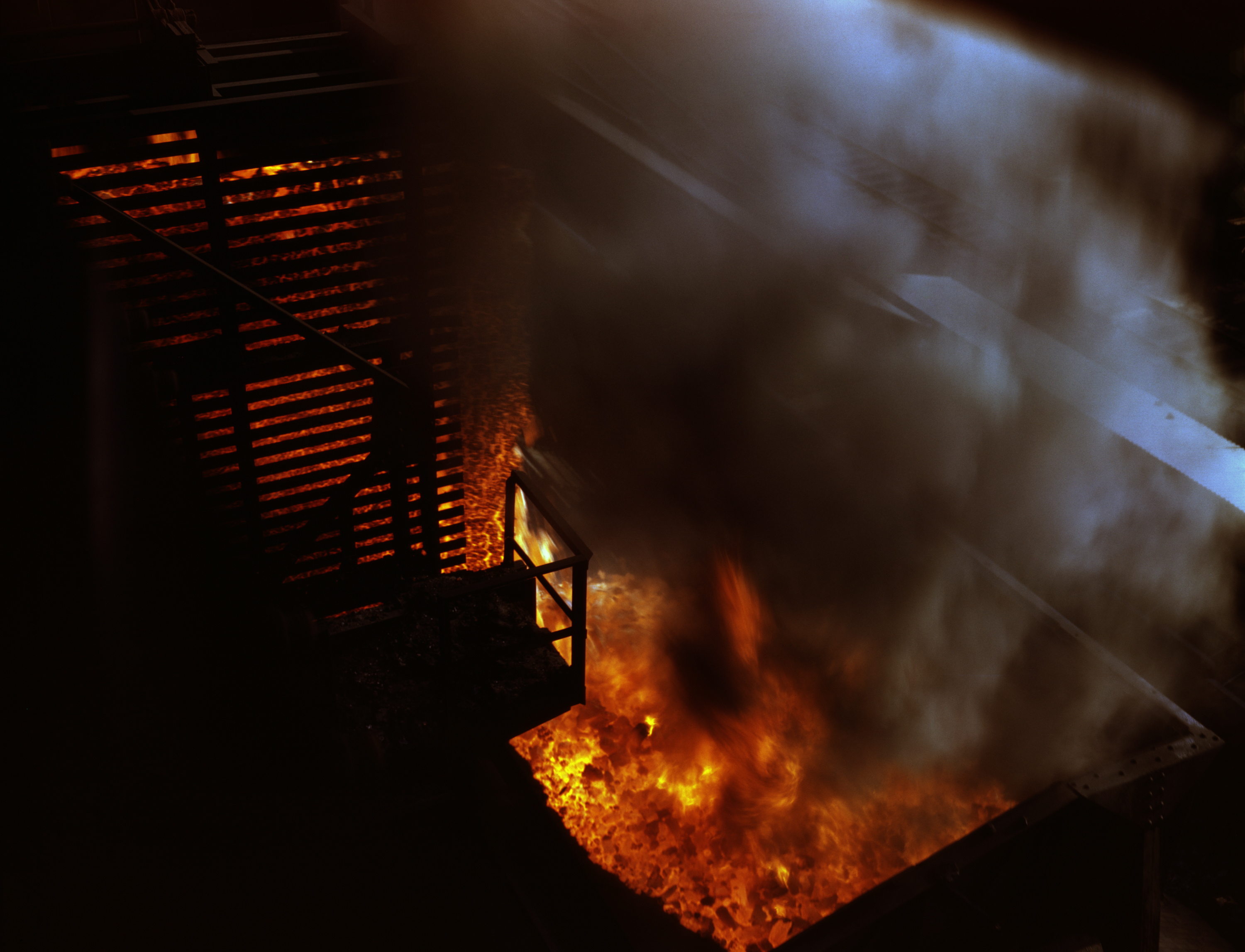
Coke being pushed into a quenching car, Hanna furnaces of the Great Lakes Steel Corporation, Detroit, Michigan, November 1942. Photograph by Arthur Siegel.

In materials science, quenching is the rapid cooling of a workpiece in water, gas, oil, polymer, air, or other fluids to obtain certain material properties. A type of heat treating, quenching prevents undesired low-temperature processes, such as phase transformations, from occurring. It does this by reducing the window of time during which these undesired reactions are both thermodynamically favorable and kinetically accessible; for instance, quenching can reduce the crystal grain size of both metallic and plastic materials, increasing their hardness.

In metallurgy, quenching is most commonly used to harden steel by inducing a martensite transformation, where the steel must be rapidly cooled through its eutectoid point, the temperature at which austenite becomes unstable. Rapid cooling prevents the formation of cementite structure, instead forcibly dissolving carbon atoms in the ferrite lattice. In steel alloyed with metals such as nickel and manganese, the eutectoid temperature becomes much lower, but the kinetic barriers to phase transformation remain the same. This allows quenching to start at a lower temperature, making the process much easier. High-speed steel also has added tungsten, which serves to raise kinetic barriers, which, among other effects, gives material properties (hardness and abrasion resistance) as though the workpiece had been cooled more rapidly than it really has. Even cooling such alloys slowly in the air has most of the desired effects of quenching; high-speed steel weakens much less from heat cycling due to high-speed cutting.

Extremely rapid cooling can prevent the formation of all crystal structures, resulting in amorphous metal or "metallic glass".

== Quench hardening ==
Quench hardening is a mechanical process in which steel and cast iron alloys are strengthened and hardened. These metals consist of ferrous metals and alloys. This is done by heating the material to a certain temperature, depending on the material. This produces a harder material by either surface hardening or through-hardening varying on the rate at which the material is cooled. The material is then often tempered to reduce the brittleness that may increase from the quench hardening process. Items that may be quenched include gears, shafts, and wear blocks.

=== Purpose ===
Before hardening, cast steels and iron are of a uniform and lamellar (or layered) pearlitic grain structure. This is a mixture of ferrite and cementite formed when steel or cast iron are manufactured and cooled at a slow rate. Pearlite is not an ideal material for many common applications of steel alloys as it is quite soft. By heating pearlite past its eutectoid transition temperature of 727 °C and then rapidly cooling, some of the material's crystal structure can be transformed into a much harder structure known as martensite. Steels with this martensitic structure are often used in applications when the workpiece must be highly resistant to deformation, such as the cutting edge of blades. This is very efficient.

=== Process ===
The process of quenching is a progression, beginning with heating the sample. Most materials are heated to between 815 and 900 °C (1,499 and 1,652 °F), with careful attention paid to keeping temperatures throughout the workpiece uniform. Minimizing uneven heating and overheating is key to imparting desired material properties.

The second step in the quenching process is soaking. Workpieces can be soaked in air (air furnace), a liquid bath, or a vacuum. The recommended time allocation in salt or lead baths is up to 6 minutes. Soaking times can range a little higher within a vacuum. As in the heating step, it is important that the temperature throughout the sample remains as uniform as possible during soaking.

Once the workpiece has finished soaking, it moves on to the cooling step. During this step, the part is submerged into some kind of quenching fluid; different quenching fluids can have a significant effect on the final characteristics of a quenched part. Water is one of the most efficient quenching media where maximum hardness is desired, but there is a small chance that it may cause distortion and tiny cracking. When hardness can be sacrificed, mineral oils are often used. These oil-based fluids often oxidize and form sludge during quenching, which consequently lowers the efficiency of the process. The cooling rate of oil is much less than water. Intermediate rates between water and oil can be obtained with a purpose-formulated quenchant, a substance with an inverse solubility that therefore deposits on the object to slow the rate of cooling.

Quenching can also be accomplished using inert gases, such as nitrogen and noble gases. Nitrogen is commonly used at greater than atmospheric pressure ranging up to 20 bar absolute. Helium is also used because its thermal capacity is greater than nitrogen. Alternatively, argon can be used; however, its density requires significantly more energy to move, and its thermal capacity is less than the alternatives. To minimize distortion in the workpiece, long cylindrical workpieces are quenched vertically; flat workpieces are quenched on the edge; and thick sections should enter the bath first. To prevent steam bubbles the bath is agitated.

Often, after quenching, an iron or steel alloy will be excessively hard and brittle due to an overabundance of martensite. In these cases, another heat treatment technique known as tempering is performed on the quenched material to increase the toughness of iron-based alloys. Tempering is usually performed after hardening, to reduce some of the excess hardness, and is done by heating the metal to some temperature below the critical point for a certain period of time, then allowing it to cool in still air.

=== Mechanism of heat removal during quenching ===
Heat is removed in three particular stages:

Stage A: Vapor bubbles formed over metal and starts cooling

During this stage, due to the Leidenfrost effect, the object is fully surrounded by vapor which insulates it from the rest of the liquid.

Stage B: Vapor-transport cooling

Once the temperature has dropped enough, the vapor layer will destabilize and the liquid will be able to fully contact the object and heat will be removed much more quickly.

Stage C: Liquid cooling

This stage occurs when the temperature of the object is below the boiling point of the liquid.

== History ==
There is evidence of the use of quenching processes by blacksmiths stretching back into the middle of the Iron Age, but little detailed information exists related to the development of these techniques and the procedures employed by early smiths. Although early ironworkers must have swiftly noticed that processes of cooling could affect the strength and brittleness of iron, and it can be claimed that heat treatment of steel was known in the Old World from the late second millennium BC, it is hard to identify deliberate uses of quenching archaeologically. Moreover, it appears that, at least in Europe, "quenching and tempering separately do not seem to have become common until the 15th century"; it is helpful to distinguish between "full quenching" of steel, where the quenching is so rapid that only martensite forms, and "slack quenching", where the quenching is slower or interrupted, which also allows pearlite to form and results in a less brittle product.

The earliest examples of quenched steel may come from ancient Mesopotamia, with a relatively secure example of a fourth-century BC quench-hardened chisel from Al Mina in Turkey. Book 9, lines 389-94 of Homer's Odyssey is widely cited as an early, possibly the first, written reference to quenching:

as when a man who works as a blacksmith plunges a screaming great axe blade or adze into cold water, treating it for temper, since this is the way steel is made strong, even so Cyclops' eye sizzled about the beam of the olive.

However, it is not beyond doubt that the passage describes deliberate quench-hardening, rather than simply cooling. Likewise, there is a prospect that the Mahabharata refers to the oil-quenching of iron arrowheads, but the evidence is problematic.

Pliny the Elder addressed the topic of quenchants, distinguishing the water of different rivers. Chapters 18–21 of the twelfth-century De diversis artis by Theophilus Presbyter mentions quenching, recommending amongst other things that 'tools are also given a harder tempering in the urine of a small, red-headed boy than in ordinary water'. One of the fuller early discussions of quenching is the first Western printed book on metallurgy, Von Stahel und Eysen, published in 1532, which is characteristic of late-medieval technical treatises.

The modern scientific study of quenching began to gain real momentum from the seventeenth century, with a major step being the observation-led discussion by Giambattista della Porta in his 1558 Magia Naturalis.

== See also ==
- Quench press
- Tempering
- Martempering
- Austempering
- Hardening (metallurgy)
