= Drawbar =

Drawbar may refer to:

- Drawbar (defense), a defensive implement used to secure a door or gate in a medieval building
- Drawbar (haulage), a device for coupling a hauling vehicle to a load
- Drawbar (machine tool), a device for securing tools e.g. in milling machines
- A slider control on a Hammond organ used for changing the timbre and sound of the instrument
- "Drawbar", a song by Linkin Park featuring Tom Morello from The Hunting Party
