= Drawbar force gauge =

Gauge for measuring forces on a machine tool's drawbar

A drawbar force gauge is a gauge designed to measure forces on a machine tool's drawbar. These types of machines are found in metalworking, woodworking, stone cutting, and carbon fiber fabricating shops. Many modern machines generate well in excess of 50,000 N (11,000 lbf). Measuring and maintaining this force is an important and necessary part of a machine shop preventative maintenance plan.

== How drawbar force gauges work ==
Modern drawbar force gauges typically are based on a force sensor that uses bonded strain gauges and electronics to convert the resulting output into a digital display for the user to view. Earlier versions of these gauges sometimes also used a sealed hydraulic cavity with a pressure gauge to measure and display force. These hydraulic gauges are generally considered less accurate because of the physical limitations of the indicator.

== Why drawbar force is measured ==
Drawbar force gauges allow early detection of problems with the spindle's Belleville spring stack, verification of performance of the clamping system as a whole, help prevent damage to spindle taper and other machine features critical to machining accuracy, and ultimately help to keep the machine operator safe.

Drawbar force measurement has been made much more important in recent years with the introduction of radically higher RPM machines. These machines are necessary to work the modern materials required in a multitude of applications—new types of composite wood material, carbon fiber, and high strength materials such as titanium. High speed machining of these materials is considered to begin at 10,000 rpm and may reach as high as 50,000 rpm. The need for regular verification of the spindle clamping system becomes obvious.

As the required machining speeds become higher, the need for machines to be built with smaller diameter spindle components increases. When the spring pack, bearings, and hydraulic units become smaller, the stresses placed upon them become greater. As a result, the clamping system will remain in good shape for fewer and fewer "cycles", or "clamp/unclamp" procedures. Again, this requires gauges and routine procedures to monitor this process. Many operators do not realize that this is something that has changed over time.

Any metal or wood working machine that takes advantage of the HSK taper system should be routinely checked. The slightest stroke mis-adjustment, dirt, or slight wear of the drawbar system can result in significantly reduced holding force. A preventative maintenance schedule, with a strict timetable for testing is a necessity when operating any type of high speed machine utilizing the HSK system.

=== Retention knob ===
Drawbar force gauges are able to detect broken or weakening components of the drawbar clamping system, can give indications that the unit needs lubrication, detect gripper mis-adjustment, or demonstrate that the incorrect retention knob is being used for the machine. A retention knob is a device screwed into the narrow end of a tool holder, enabling the drawbar to pull the tool holder into the spindle. With a highly accurate electronic gauge, deficiencies can be noted and corrected. Many hours of expensive machine operating time can be put to use while avoiding fretting, chatter, "stuck" tool holders in a spindle, etc., by employing proper preventative maintenance techniques using an accurate electronic gauge and other spindle health management tools.

== Drawbar force gauges in tool holder standards ==
The following tool holder standards specifically address tool retention force as measured by a drawbar force gauge:

- HSK standard ISO 12164-1: Hollow taper interface with flange contact surface—Part 1: Shanks—Dimensions
- Steep Taper standard ASME B5.50: 7/24 Taper Tool to Spindle Connection for Automatic Tool Change
- Capto Taper standard ISO 26623-1: Polygonal taper interface with flange contact surface—Part 1: Dimensions and designation of shanks
