= Collet =

Type of chuck

A W-type external-thread collet (red) being pulled into its spindle seat (green) with a drawbar (blue), clamping, rotating and then releasing a shaft.

A collet /ˈkɒlɪt/ is a segmented sleeve, band or collar. One of the two radial surfaces of a collet is usually tapered (i.e a truncated cone) and the other is cylindrical. The term collet commonly refers to a type of chuck that uses collets to hold either a workpiece or a tool (such as a drill), but collets have other mechanical applications.

An external collet is a sleeve with a cylindrical inner surface and a conical outer surface. The collet can be squeezed against a matching taper such that its inner surface contracts to a slightly smaller diameter, squeezing the tool or workpiece to hold it securely. Most often the collet is made of spring steel, with one or more kerf cuts along its length to allow it to expand and contract. This type of collet holds the external surface of the tool or workpiece being clamped. This is the most usual type of collet chuck. An external collet clamps against the internal surface or bore of a hollow cylinder. The collet's taper is internal and the collet expands when a corresponding taper is drawn or forced into the collet's internal taper.

As a clamping device, collets are capable of producing a high clamping force and accurate alignment. While the clamping surface of a collet is normally cylindrical, it can be made to accept any defined shape.

== Collet chucks for machine tools ==
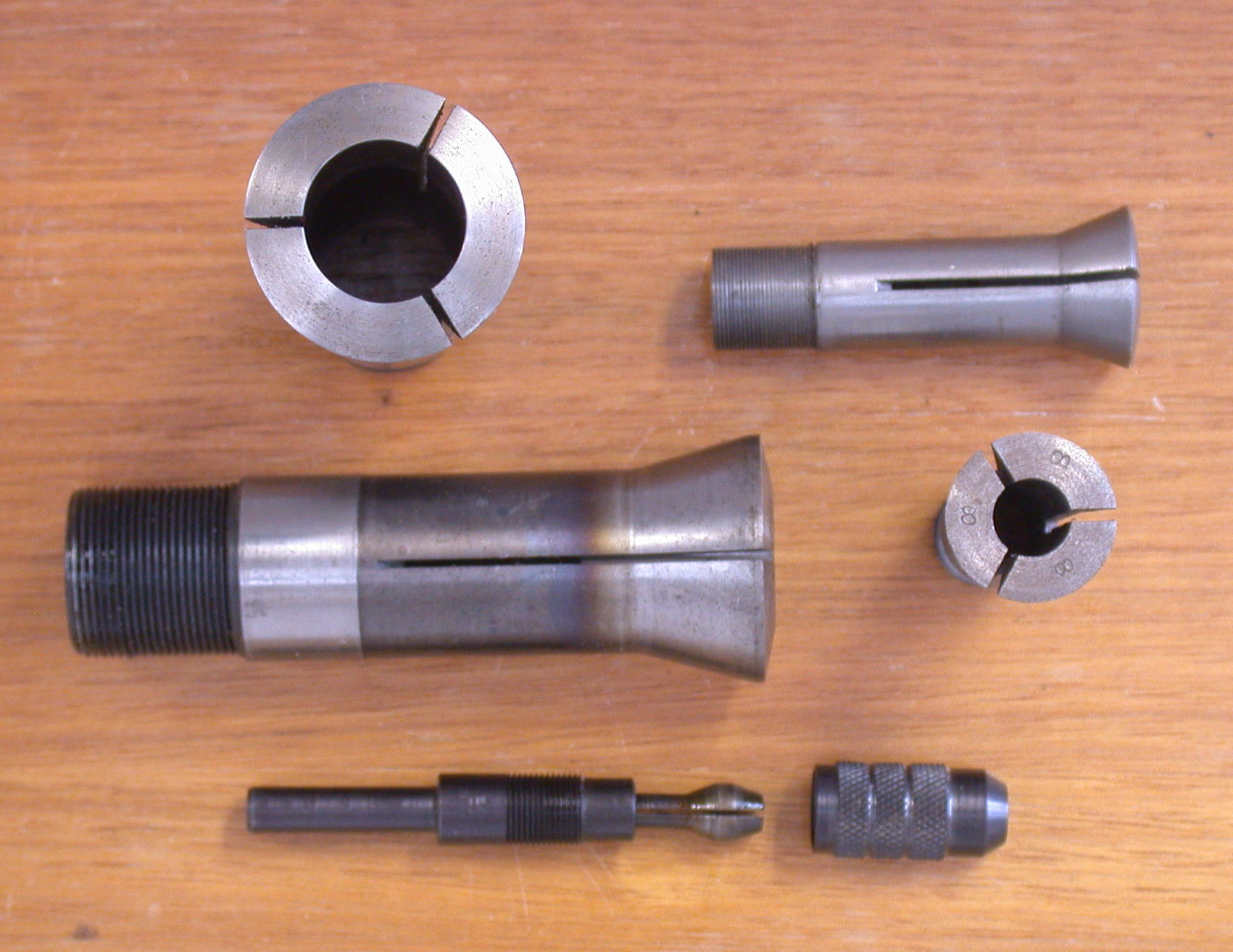
Several machine collets (top and centre) and a dismantled pin chuck (below).

Generally, a collet chuck, considered as a unit, consists of a tapered receiving sleeve (sometimes integral with the machine spindle), the collet proper (usually made of spring steel) which is inserted into the receiving sleeve, and (often) a cap that screws over the collet, clamping it via another taper.

For machining operations, such as turning, chucks are commonly used to hold the workpiece. The table below gives a functional comparison of the three most common types of chuck used for holding workpieces.

Comparison with different types of chucks
-	Collet	Scroll chuck	Independent-jaw chuck
1. Fast chucking (unclamp one part, switch to a new part, reclamp)	Reliably	Reliably	Generally not
2. Self centering	Reliably	Reliably	Never
3. Strong clamping	Reliably	Usually	Reliably
4. Resistance against being jarred loose (untightened)	Reliably	To varying extents	Usually
5. Precise centering (run-out less than 0.005 in (0.13 mm) TIR and usually less than 0.001 in (0.025 mm))	Reliably	Not reliably	Reliably (but requires time and skill)

Collets have a narrow clamping range and a large number of collets are required to hold a given range of tools (such as drills) or stock material. This gives the disadvantage of higher capital cost and makes them unsuitable for general usage in electric drills, etc. However, the collet's advantage over other types of chuck is that it combines all of the following traits into one chuck; making it highly useful for repetitive work.

=== Metalworking ===
There are many types of collet used in the metalworking industry. Common industry-standard designs are R8 (internally threaded for mills) and 5C (usually externally threaded for lathes). There are also proprietary designs which only fit one manufacturer's equipment. Collets can range in holding capacity from zero to several inches in diameter. The most common type of collet grips a round bar or tool, but there are collets for square, hexagonal, and other shapes. In addition to the outside-holding collets, there are collets used for holding a part on its inside surface so that it can be machined on the outside surface (similar to an expanding mandrel). Furthermore, it is not uncommon for machinists to make a custom collet to hold any unusual size or shape of part. These are often called emergency collets (e-collets) or soft collets (from the fact that they are bought in a soft (unhardened) state and machined as needed). Yet another type of collet is a step collet which steps up to a larger diameter from the spindle and allows holding of larger workpieces.

In use, the part to be held is inserted into the collet and then the collet is pressed (using a threaded nose cap) or drawn (using a threaded drawbar) into the body which has a conjugate taper form. The taper geometry serves to translate a portion of the axial drawing force into a radial clamping force. When properly tightened, enough force is applied to securely clamp the workpiece or tool. The cap or drawbar threads act as a screw lever, and this leverage is compounded by the taper, such that a modest torque on the screw produces an enormous clamping force.

The precise, symmetric form and rigid material of the collet provide precise, repeatable radial centering and axial concentricity. The basic mechanism fixes four of the six degrees of kinematic freedom, two locations and two angles. Collets may also be fitted to precisely align parts in the axial direction (a fifth degree of freedom) with an adjustable internal stop or by a shoulder stop machined into the internal form. The remaining sixth degree of freedom, namely the rotation of the part in the collet, may be fixed by using square, hexagonal, or other non-circular part geometry.

==== ER collets ====
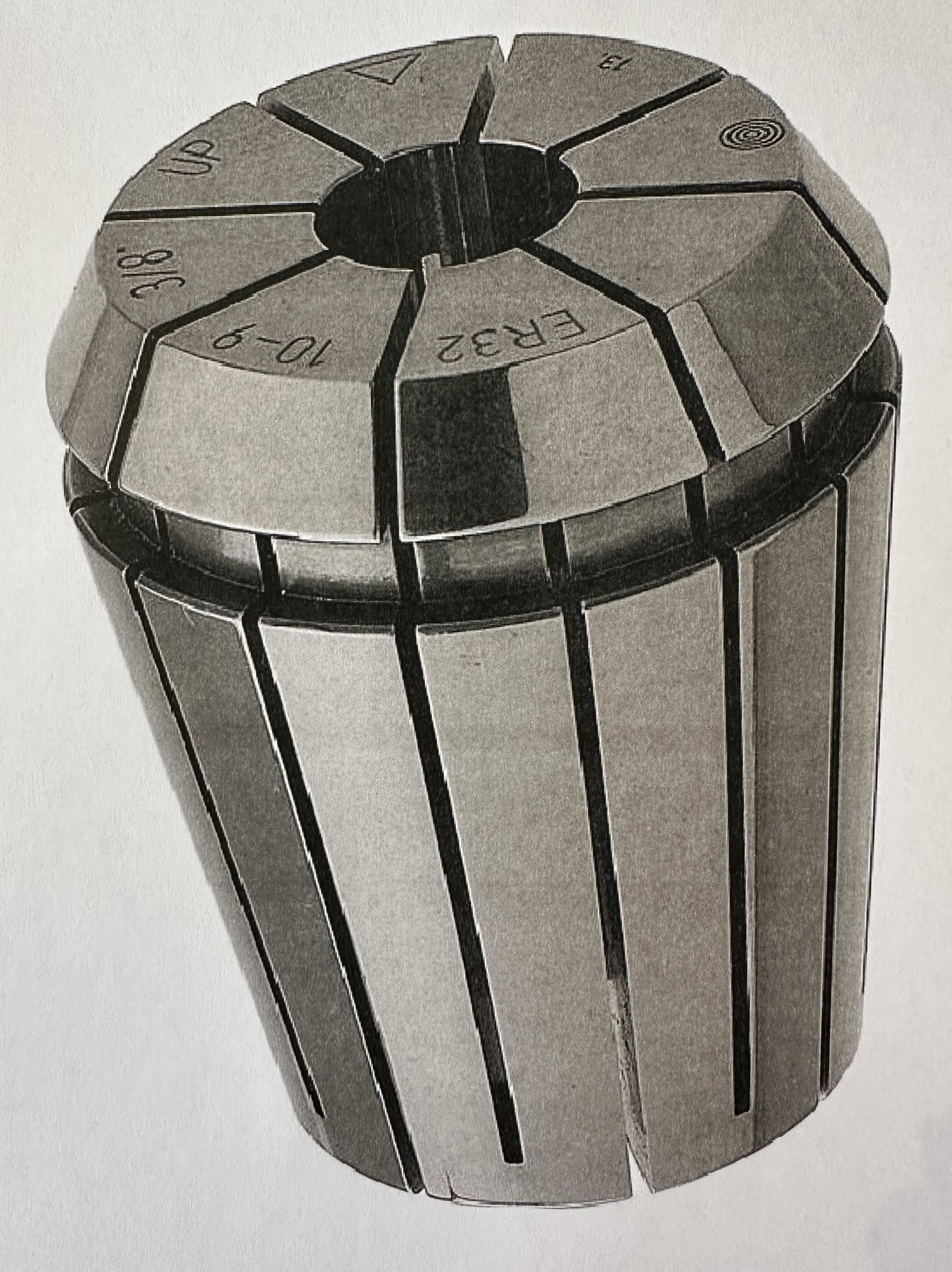
ER Collet

The "ER" collet system, developed and patented by Swiss manufacturer Rego-Fix in 1972, and standardized as DIN 6499, is the most widely used tool clamping system in the world and today available from many producers worldwide. The standard series are: ER-8, ER-11, ER-16, ER-20, ER-25, ER-32, ER-40, and ER-50. The "ER" name came from an existing "E" collet (which were a letter series of names) which Rego-Fix modified and appended "R" for "Rego-Fix". The series number is the opening diameter of the tapered receptacle, in millimetres. ER collets collapse to hold parts up to 1 mm smaller than the nominal collet internal size in most of the series (up to 2 mm smaller in ER-50, and 0.5 mm in smaller sizes) and are available in 1 mm or 0.5 mm steps. Thus a given collet holds any diameter ranging from its nominal size to its 1-mm-smaller collapsed size, and a full set of ER collets in nominal 1 mm steps fits any possible cylindrical diameter within the capacity of the series. With an ER fixture chuck, ER collets may also serve as workholding fixtures for small parts, in addition to their usual application as toolholders with spindle chucks. Although a metric standard, ER collets with internal inch sizes are widely available for convenient use of imperial sized tooling. The spring geometry of the ER collet is well-suited only to cylindrical parts, and not typically applied to square or hexagonal forms like 5C collets.

==== Autolock collets ====
"Autolock" collet chucks (Osbourn "Pozi-Lock" is a similar system) were designed to provide secure clamping of milling cutters with only hand tightening. They were developed in the 1940s by a now defunct UK company, Clarkson (Engineers) Limited, and are commonly known as Clarkson chucks. Autolock collets require cutters with threaded shank ends to screw into the collet itself. Any rotation of the cutter forces the collet against the collet cap taper which tightly clamps the cutter, the screw fitting also prevents any tendency of the cutter to pull out. Collets are only available in fixed sizes, imperial or metric, and the cutter shank must be an exact match.

The tightening sequence of Autolock collets is widely misunderstood. The chuck cap itself does not tighten the collet at all, with the cap tight and no tool inserted the collet is loose in the chuck. Only when a cutter is inserted will the collet be pressed against the cap taper. The back of the cutter engages with a centering pin and further turning drives the collet against the chuck cap, tightening around the cutter shank, hence "Autolock".

The correct installation sequence as per the original specification is:

1. Insert the collet and hand tighten the chuck cap (collet free to float)
2. Insert the tool and hand tighten (tool engaged with rear pin and collet engaging cap taper)

As the tool is used further rotation tightens the collet and the centering pin ensures that tool extension and alignment remain unchanged. A spanner is only required to release the locked collet.

While threaded shank "Autolock" tools may be gripped by plain collets, such as ER, plain shank tools should never be used in an "Autolock" collet as they will not be properly clamped or aligned.

==== R8 collets ====
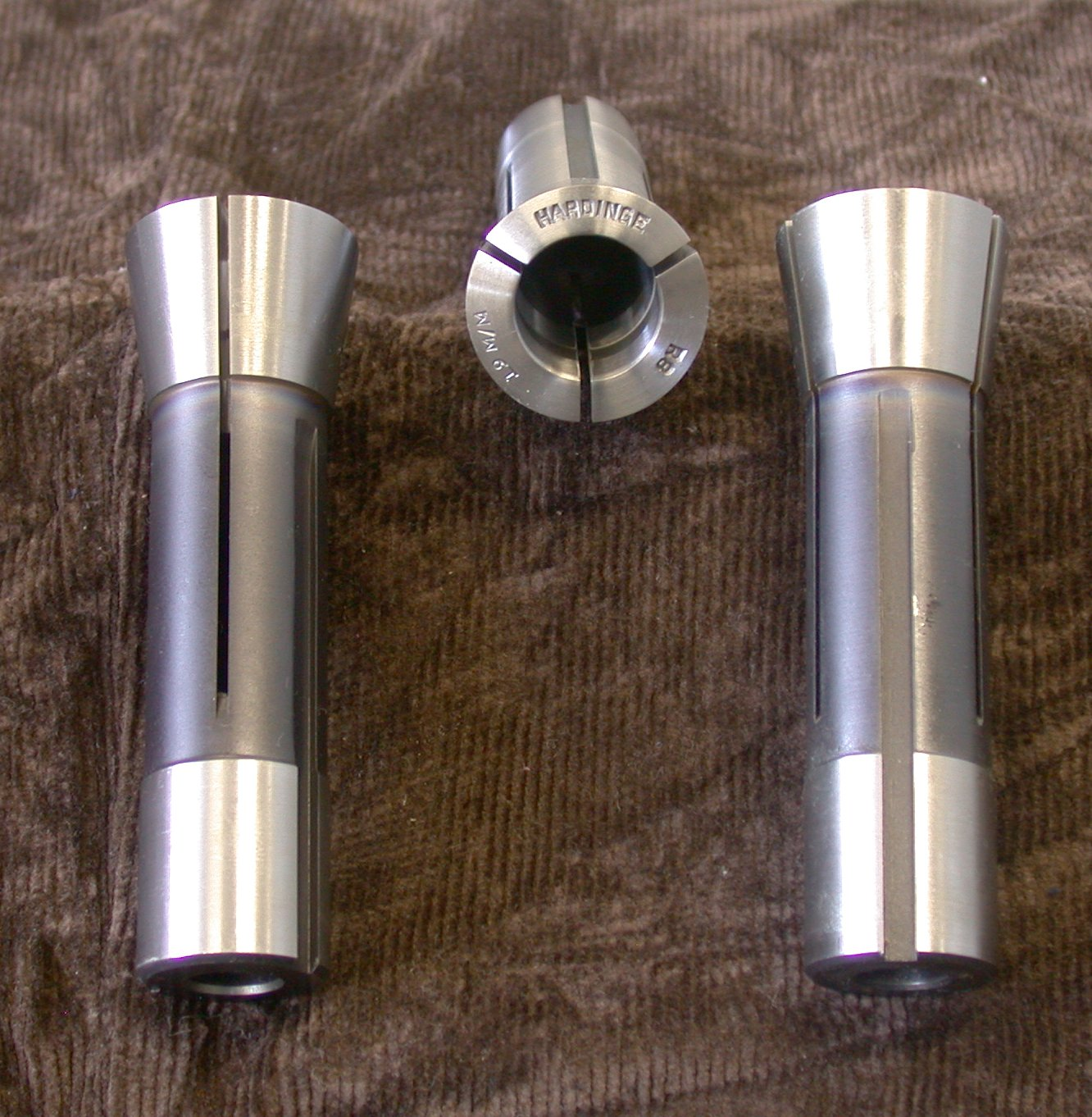
R8 Collets

R8 collets were developed by Bridgeport Machines, Inc. for use in milling machines. Unusually, R8 collets fit into the machine taper itself (i.e. there is no separate chuck) and tools with integral R8 taper can also be directly fitted. R8 was developed to allow rapid tool changes and requires an exact match between collet and tool shank diameter.

R8 collets have a keyway to prevent rotation when fitting or removing, but it is the compressed taper and not the keyway that provides the driving force. Collets are compressed by a drawbar from behind, they are self releasing and tool changes can be automated.

==== 5C collets ====
Unlike most other machine collet systems, 5C collets were developed primarily for work holding. Superficially similar to R8 collets, 5C collets have an external thread at the rear for drawing the collet closed, and so work pieces may pass right through the collet and chuck (5C collets often also have an internal thread for workpiece locating). Collets are also available to hold square and hex stock. 5C collets have a limited closing range, and so shank and collet diameters must be a close match. A number of other C-series collets (1C, 3C, 4C, 5C, 16C, 20C & 25C) with different holding ranges also exist.

A collet system with capabilities similar to the 5C (originally a proprietary system of Hardinge) is the 2J (originally a proprietary system of Sjogren, a competitor of Hardinge, and which Hardinge later assimilated).

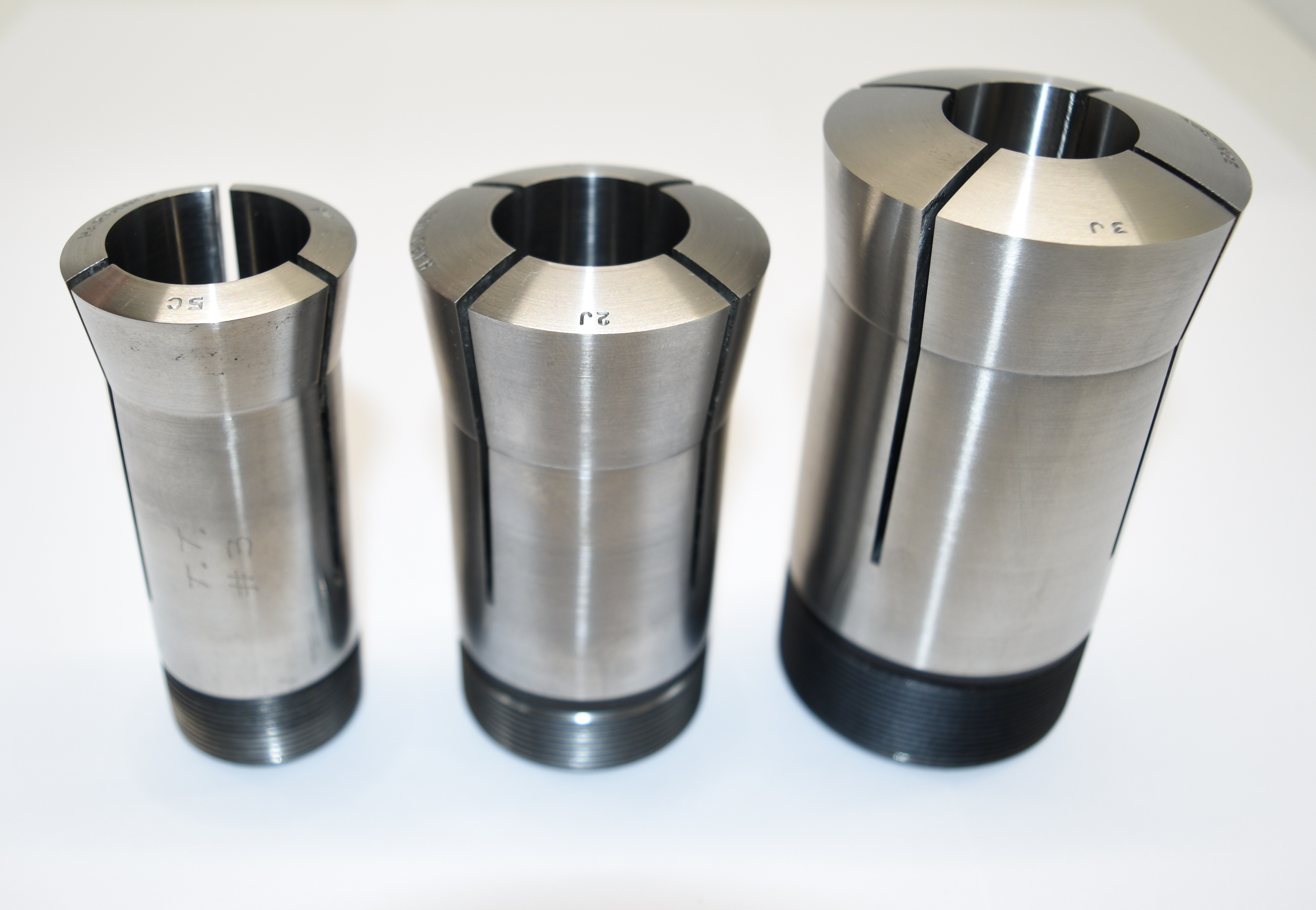
From left to right 5C, 2J and 3J collets. All 1" workholding size.

==== 355E Collets ====
The SO Deckel tool grinders use these. Sometimes called U2 collets.

==== Watchmaker collets ====
Watchmaking at Waltham, Massachusetts led to the invention of collets. Watchmakers' lathes all take collets which are sized by their external thread. The most popular size is 8 mm which came in several variations but all 8 mm collets are interchangeable. Lorch, a German Lathe maker, started with 6 mm collets and the first Boleys used a 6.5 mm collet. 6 mm collets will fit into a 6.5 mm lathe but it is a poor practice. Another popular size is the 10 mm collet used by Clement and Levin. For work holding, collets are sized in 0.1 mm increments with the number on the face being the diameter in tenths of a millimetre. Thus a 5 is a 0.5 mm collet.

Watchmaker collets come in additional configurations. There are step collets which step inward to hold gear wheels by the outer perimeter. These typically were made in sets of five to accommodate a range of different size gear wheels. These, like straight rod-holding collets, close on the outer taper. Ring collets also come in sets of five and hold work from inside a hole. They open as they are tightened by an outside taper against the outer taper of the lathe headstock.

Watch collets also include taper adapters and wax or cement chucks. These collets take an insert, usually brass, to which small parts are cemented, usually with shellac.

The book The Modern Watchmaker's Lathe and How to Use it contains tables of makers and sizes; note that it refers to basic collets as split wire chucks.

==== DIN 6343 dead length collets ====
These collets are common especially on production machines, particularly European lathes with lever or automated closers. Unlike draw-in collets, they do not pull back to close, but are generally pushed forward, with the face remaining in place.

==== Multi-size collets ====
Collets allowing a wider range of workholding by means of springs or elastic spacers between jaws; such collets were developed by Jacobs (Rubberflex), Crawford (Multibore), and Pratt Burnerd, and are in some cases compatible with certain spring collet chucks.

==== Morse taper collets ====
The Morse taper is a common machine taper frequently used in drills, lathes and small milling machines. Chucks for drilling usually use a Morse taper and can be removed to accommodate Morse taper drill bits. Morse taper collet sets usually employ ER collets in an adaptor to suit the Morse taper. The adaptor is threaded to be held in place with a drawbar. They can be used to hold straight-shanked tooling (drills and milling cutters) more securely and with better accuracy (less run-out) than a chuck.

== Other applications ==
=== Woodwork ===
On a wood router (a hand-held or table-mounted power tool used in woodworking), the collet is what holds the bit in place. In the U.S. it is generally for 0.25 or 0.5 inches (6.4 or 12.7 mm) bits, while in Europe bits are most commonly 6, 8 or 12 mm (0.24, 0.31 or 0.47 in). The collet nut is hexagonal on the outside so it can be tightened or loosened with a standard wrench, and has threads on the inside so it can be screwed onto the motor arbor.

=== Craft hobbies ===
Many users (hobbyists, graphic artists, architects, students, and others) may be familiar with collets as the part of an X-Acto or equivalent knife that holds the blade. Another common example is the collet that holds the bits of a Dremel or equivalent rotary tool.

=== Semiconductor work ===
In semiconductor industry, a die collet is used for picking a die up from a wafer after die cutting process has finished, and bonding it into a package. Some of them are made with rubber, and use vacuum for picking.

=== Internal combustion engines ===
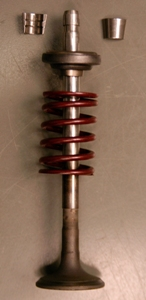
Valve, spring, retainer and split collet

Most internal combustion engines use a split collet to hold both the inlet and exhaust valves under constant valve spring pressure which returns the valves to their closed position when the camshaft lobes are not in contact with the top of the valves. The two collet halves have an internal raised rib which locate into a circular groove near the top of each valve stem, the outer side of the collet halves are a taper fit into the spring retainer (also known as a collar), this taper locks the retainer in place and the raised rib that sits in the circular groove on the valve stem also locks the collet halves in place to the valve stem. To remove the valves from a cylinder head a 'valve spring compressor' is used to compress the valve springs by exerting force on the spring retainer which allows the collets to be removed, when the compressor is removed, the retainer, spring and valve can then be removed from the cylinder head. It may be realized that the retainer does not budge when the valve spring compressor is used, this is due to a buildup of carbon which over time has locked the retainer and collets slightly. A slight sharp tap on the backside of the valve spring compressor above the valve stem should free the retainer allowing the springs to be compressed whilst retrieving the split collet. On reassembly it is difficult to keep the split collets in place whilst the compressor is released, by applying a small amount of grease to the internal side of the split collets will keep them in place on the valve stem whilst releasing the compressor, then as the spring retainer rises it locks the tapered split collets in place.

=== Firearms ===
Schematic of a (straight-pull) collet locked firearm operation

The Blaser R93 (and related models) use a unique bolt locking system that employs an expanding collet. The collet has claw-like L-shaped segments that face outward from the axis of the barrel. The multiple claws give a large contact area to distribute load. As the breech is closed, the collet expands, extending the claws to engaging with an annular groove in the barrel just behind the chamber; locking the bolt closed. The Thompson .30-06 prototype used a collet locking operation.

== See also ==
- Chuck (engineering)
- Leadscrew
- Machine taper
- Screw thread
- Stiction
