= Magnus Wahlström =

Magnus Wahlstrom
- Born: October 28, 1903; Surahammar, Sweden
- Died: January 30, 1972 (aged 68); Bridgeport, Connecticut, USA
- Resting place: Mountain Grove Cemetery, Bridgeport, Connecticut, U.S.
- Occupation: Entrepreneur
- Known for: Cofounder of Bridgeport Machines Inc
- Spouse: Agnes Johnson (1902–1999)
- Children: Eleonora (1935-2021)

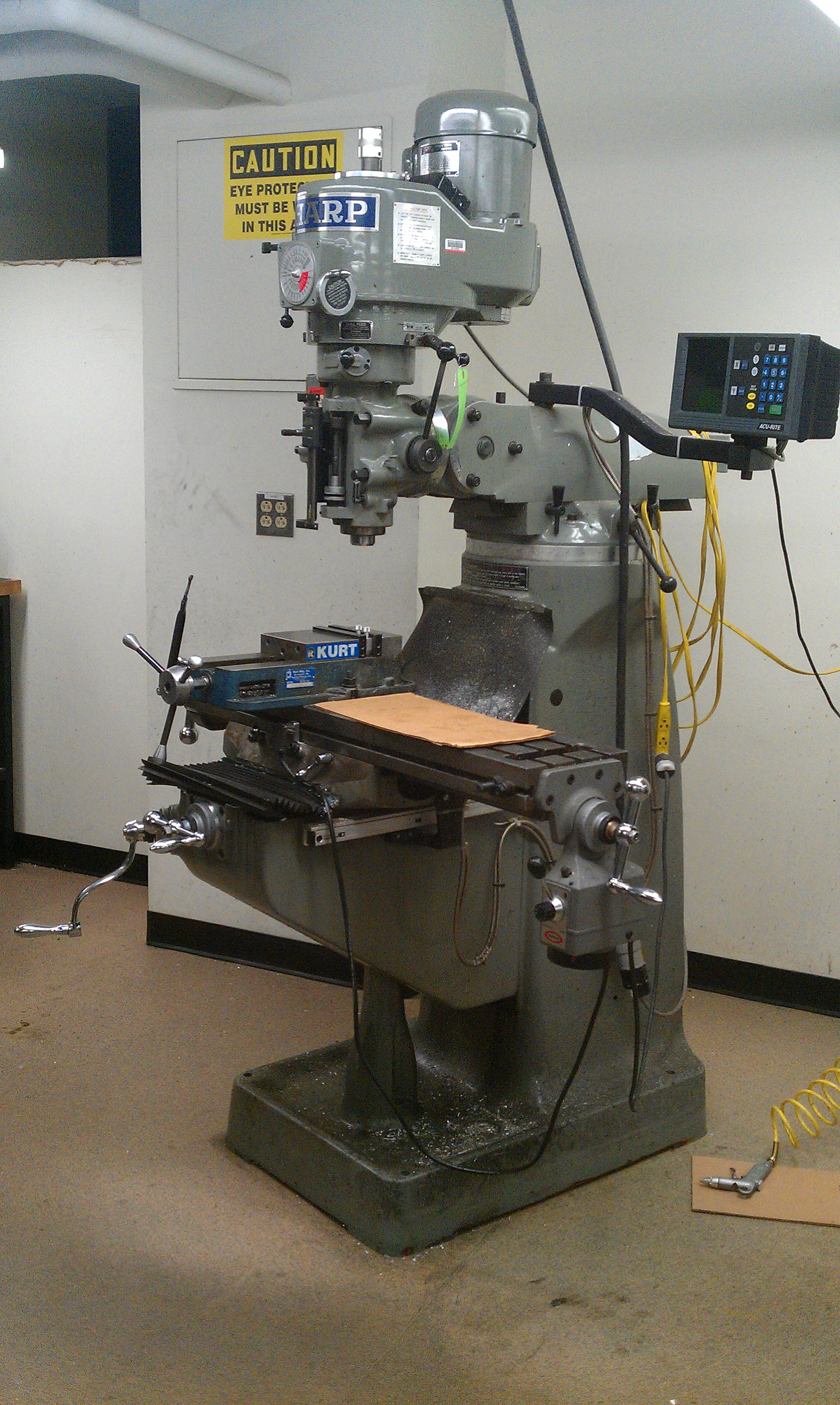
A vertical mill of the form factor developed and made famous by Bridgeport Machines Inc. The head is mounted on the ram by joints that allow it to swivel in two directions. The ram can slide back and forth on the turret, which can swivel on the column. The table sits on the knee, and it can move horizontally in the X and Y axes. The knee rides up and down the column (one form of Z-axis movement), and the head contains a quill in which the spindle can slide up and down (another form of Z-axis movement or, when the head is swiveled, an additional axis).

Magnus Wahlström (October 28, 1903 in Surahammar Municipality, Sweden – January 30, 1972 in Bridgeport, Connecticut, USA), often Wahlstrom in English, was a Swedish American entrepreneur and later a philanthropist. He was married to Agnes (née Johnson); they had a daughter, Eleanora.

In his youth he worked on Surahammar's Mill, first in the office and then in the mechanical workshop. Wahlstrom moved to the United States in 1923. His first stop was Chicago. In Chicago he met another Swedish American, Rudolph Bannow (1897–1962). Another friend was Gerhard 'Gerry' T. Rooth. Bannow and Wahlstrom founded the business that became Bridgeport Machines, Inc, a major machine tool builder famous for its milling machines.

The meeting with Bannow was the start of a successful partnership. The two began by producing electric hedge clippers. After much hard work, their first universal milling machine was built in 1932. By 1936, their company was called the Bridgeport Pattern and Model Works and was offering milling heads (the part of a mill where the spindle is) commercially. The American Precision Museum's biography of Rudolph Bannow reports that he conceived the iconic Bridgeport ram-and-turret, knee-and-column design in 1936 as the logical machine on which to mount the milling head already being built by the company. In 1938 they began selling whole milling machines. The company had now established itself as a machine tool builder named Bridgeport Machines, Inc. After getting into this business line, the company started to become very successful.

In 1968, the company was sold to Textron for US$101 million, about $850 million in 2014 values. Upon this sale, the company employed approximately 1000 people.

Wahlstrom donated a lot of time and money to charity. Among other things, he helped the poor in Bridgeport with rent and food. Wahlstrom also invested capital in the newspaper Nordstjernan in 1953 to help the newspaper to avoid bankruptcy.

The University of Bridgeport Library is named after his support to the university.

== Cited sources ==
- American Precision Museum (1992), "Rudolph Bannow (1897–1962)", Machine Tool Hall of Fame, American Precision Museum, archived from the original on February 3, 2014.
