= Bridgeport (machine tool brand) =

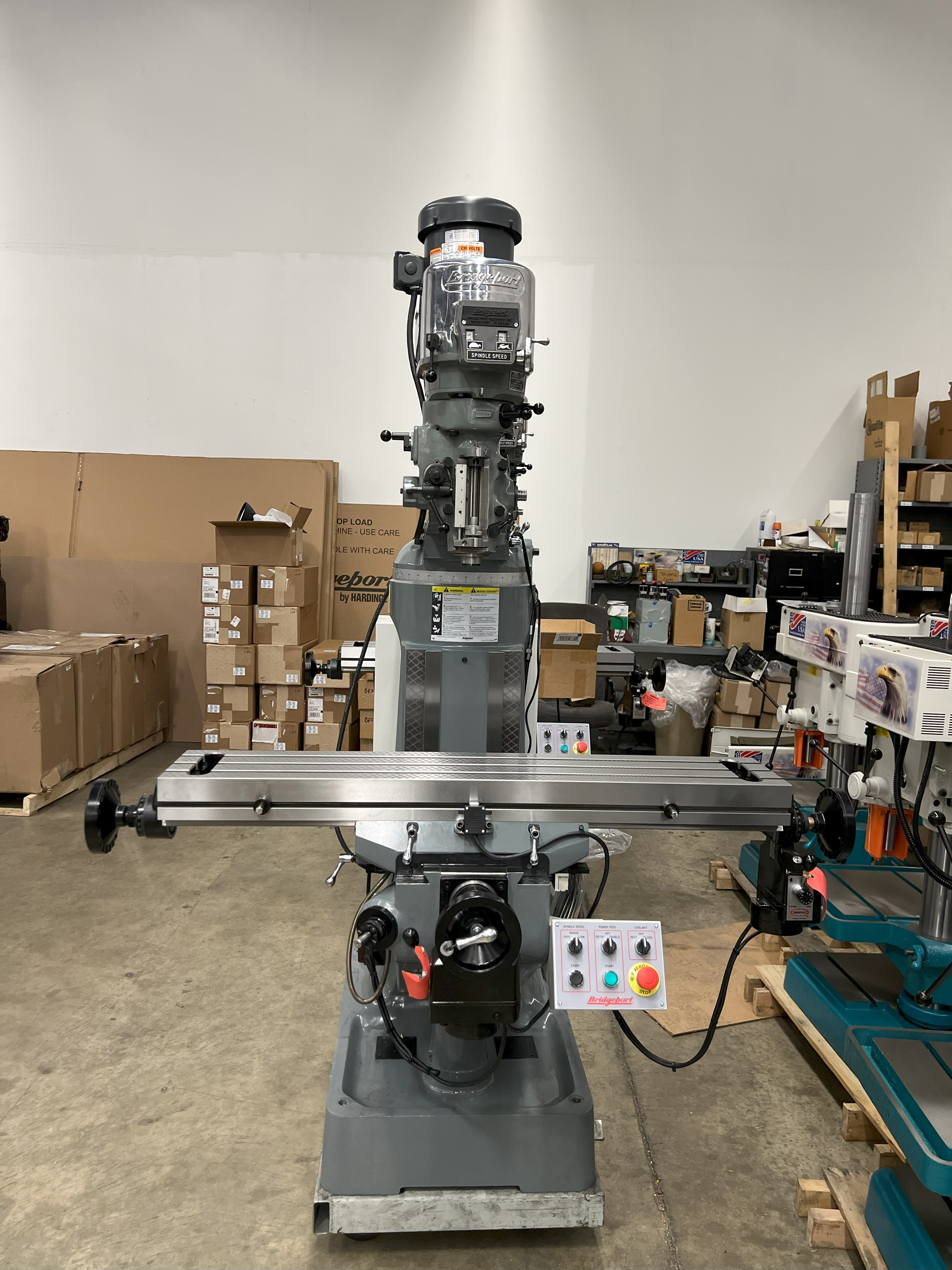
A full view of a Bridgeport Series 1 Knee Mill. The head is mounted on the ram by joints that allow it to swivel in two directions. The ram can slide back and forth on the turret, which can swivel on the column. The table sits on the knee, and it can move horizontally in the X and Y axes. The knee rides up and down the column (one form of Z-axis movement), and the head contains a quill in which the spindle can slide up and down (another form of Z-axis movement or, when the head is swiveled, an additional axis).

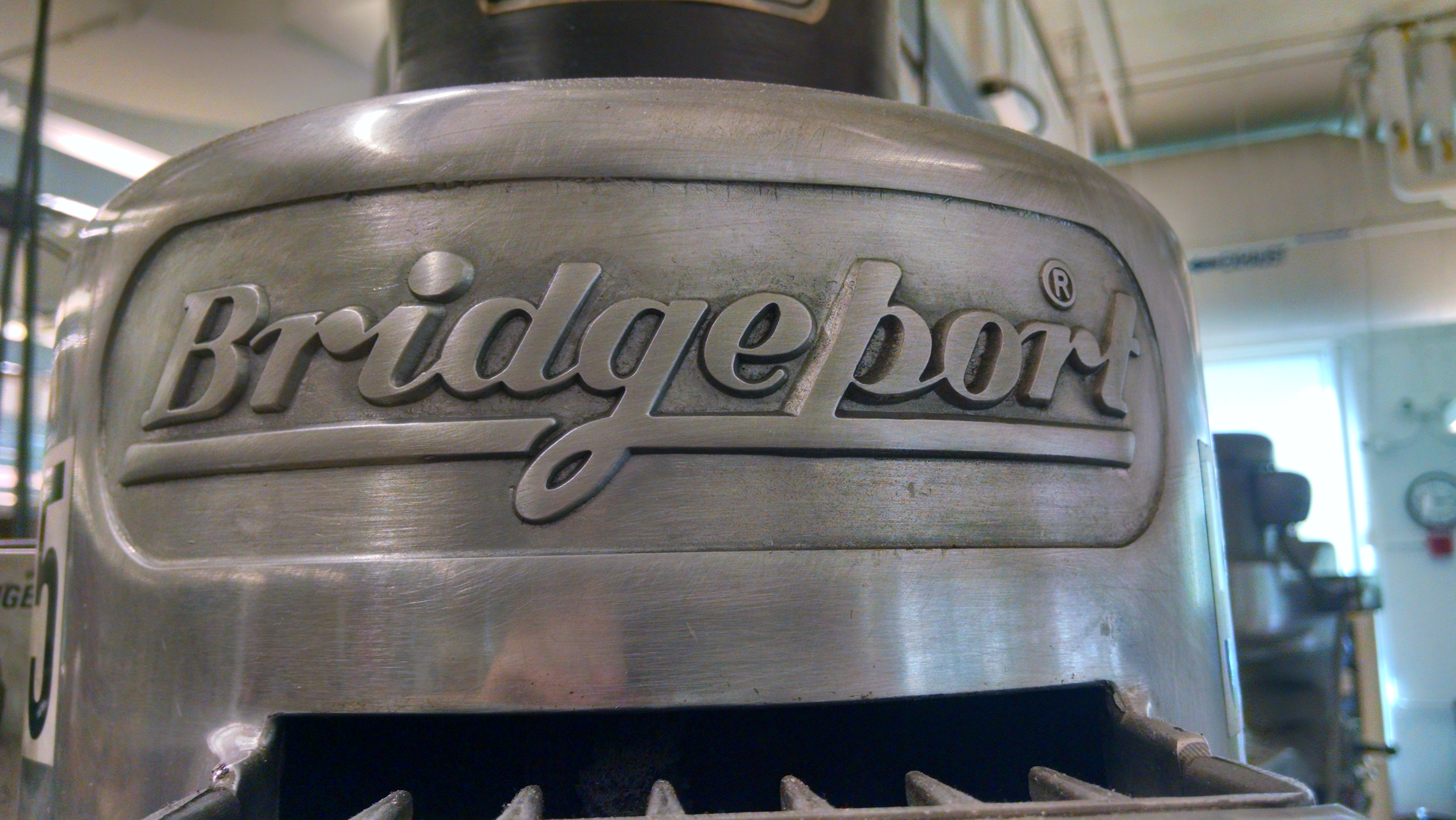
The Bridgeport logo as cast into the head of a Bridgeport Knee Mill.

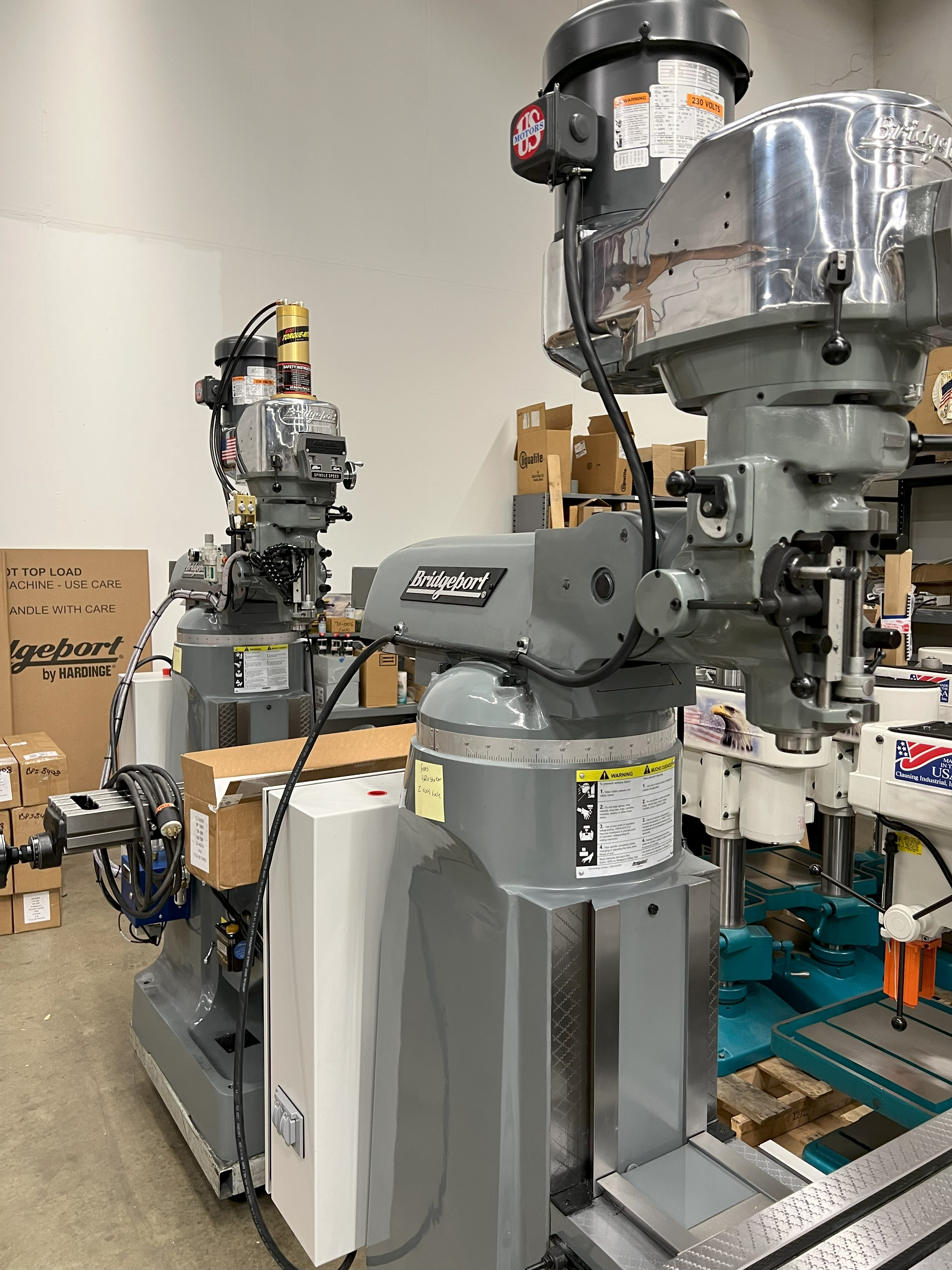
The patented "2J" head ensures that any heat buildup in the spindle bearings, belt, or quill area is kept to an absolute minimum. This results in increased belt and bearing life as well as consistent accuracy with no external cooling fans required, increasing rigidity and vibration dampening properties.

Bridgeport Machines, Inc., is a machine tool builder founded in 1938 in the United States of America. It manufactures Milling machines and Lathes.

Bridgeport mills are still widely used in metalworking applications, including milling slots, gears, and fixtures in steel and aluminum, and remain common in CNC-equipped automotive machine shops in South Korea.

== History ==
The original corporation was founded in Bridgeport, Connecticut, and started selling its machines in 1938. It became known in the following decades for small and medium-sized vertical milling machines, with a form of quill equipped multiple-speed vertical milling head with a ram-on-turret mounting over a knee-and-column base. The American Precision Museum's biography of Rudolph Bannow reports that he conceived the design in 1936 as the logical machine on which to mount the milling head already being built by the Bridgeport Pattern and Model Works (which he owned with a partner Magnus Wahlstrom). The first Bridgeport milling machine (serial number 1) is on display at the Museum.

Due to the overall success of the company's milling machines, the term "Bridgeport" is often used to refer to any vertical milling machine of the same configuration, regardless of make. Many other companies have cloned the form. Today, the Bridgeport brand still produces this configuration in both manual and computer numerical control (CNC) versions, and such machining centers are now equally as prominent as their manual counterparts.

Bridgeport manual milling machines came in many types and sizes over the years, including (but not limited to) the C head (original), R head (heavy duty C head), M head, J head (and high speed, 5440 RPM version), 2J1 1/2 head (1.5 HP Vari-Speed), 2J2 (2HP Vari-speed), and Series II head (4HP Vari-speed). All of the heads offered variable speeds, the earlier ones via a step pulley (cone pulley) and the later ones via either continuously variable transmission (CVT) systems or variable-speed drive. Typical table sizes were 9″ × 49″ (Y and X, respectively) and 10″ × 54″. Machine tapers for tool holding included Morse tapers (on early models) and the R8 taper (a widely used standard that Bridgeport created) on most models. Both Morse and R8 allowed for both collets and solid holders, and a drill chuck could be held by either of the latter. Currently R8 and Erickson #30 Quick Change tool holders are available. Machine slides are of the dovetail type, and rotary bearings are mostly of the roller and ball types.

Through 1970, Bridgeport turret milling machines were made under licence by Adcock-Shipley, a UK manufacturer of horizontal and vertical milling machines founded during WW1. Bridgeport machines were built in two UK plants, Bridlington in Yorkshire and Forest Road in Leicester for the UK and international markets. By 1975 Bridgeport had acquired Adcock-Shipley and by 1980 had opened an assembly plant in Singapore to serve the Australasian market.

== Bridgeport Machines Inc. timeline ==
- 1927 Rudolph F. Bannow purchased the Bridgeport Pattern and Model Works
- 1929 Rudolph F. Bannow and Magnus Wahlstrom began business association
- 1932 First Universal Milling Attachment shipped (to Atlas Tool of Bridgeport)
- 1938 Aug. 8, First Bridgeport Turret Milling Machine shipped (to Precision Castings Corp. of Syracuse, N.Y.)
- 1939 Incorporation of Bridgeport Machines
- 1941 Addition to Factory – 2,400 square feet
- 1944 Addition to Factory – 4.200 square feet
- 1945 Jan., 5,000 Bridgeport Miller sold (Machinery Sales of California.)
- 1946 Addition of Factory - 5,190 square feet
- 1948 Oct., 10,000 Bridgeport Miller sold
- 1951 Bridgeport Machines Inc. moved to 500 Lindley Street (Dec. 1951 – First Bridgeport Miller shipped from here – 14,476th Miller)
- 1953 April 30, Profit Sharing Plan started
- 1954 March 17, 20,000 Bridgeport Miller shipped
- 1955 Sept., Addition to Factory – 3,968 square feet
- 1957 Additions to Factory totaling 22,821 square feet
- 1959 Jan. 30, Adcock-Shipley licensed (England)
- 1960 Jan., Opened Plant II at Remer St. (in original plant)
- 1960 March 17, True Trace Corporation of California purchased
- 1960 June 6, 50,000 Bridgeport Miller came off the assembly line
- 1962 June 23, Death of Rudolph F. Bannow, President
- 1962 July 30, Magnus Wahlstrom assumes Presidency of Bridgeport Machines Inc.
- 1963 Spring, Addition of Factory - 17,075 square feet
- 1963 April 30, 500th employee hired
- 1963 Sept. 20, First Open House at Bridgeport Machines Inc.
- 1965 Feb., 80,000th Bridgeport Miller came off the assembly line
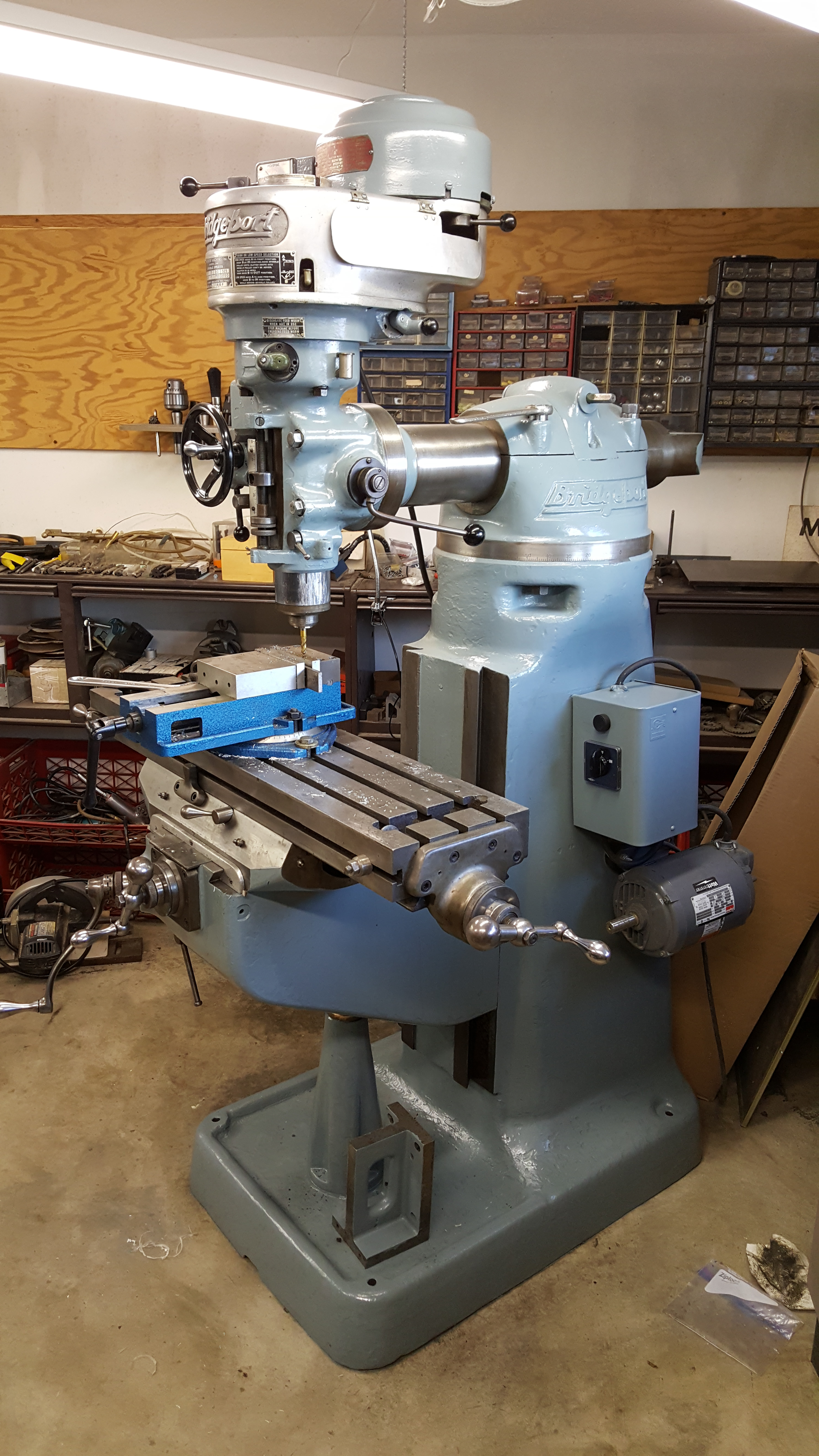
- 1955 "round ram" model with J-head, restored.
  1965 Aug., Auditorium, cafeteria and additional office facilities completed
- 1965 Nov. 1, 600th employee hired
- 1965 Nov., Finished renovating and built addition for Plant 3
- 1966 Dec. 12, 700th employee hired
- 1967 March 6, 100,000th Bridgeport Miller came off the assembly line
- 1967 June 11, Open House for employees and families
- 1968 March 1, Bridgeport Machines Inc. sold to Textron Inc.
- 2004 Acquired by Hardinge, Inc.
- 2023 Acquired by InCompass

== Bibliography ==
- American Precision Museum (1992), "Rudolph Bannow (1897-1962)", Machine Tool Hall of Fame, American Precision Museum, archived from the original on 2014-02-03.
- Earls, Alan R. (November–December 2010), "Celebrating America's Love Affair with Machining", Today's Machining World, 6 (9), archived from the original on 2011-02-17.
