= ASME B5 =

ASME B5 refers to a technical committee of the American Society of Mechanical Engineers and the standard they maintain which deals with machine tools.

== Machine tools ==
As a Standards Development Organization, ASME continues to develop and maintains nearly 600 codes and standards in a wide range of disciplines including pressure technology, nuclear plants, elevators / escalators, construction, engineering design, and performance testing. Machine Tool standards are developed and maintained by ASME B5 Committee, which operates under ASME's Board on Standardization and Testing. The B5 Standards Committee currently meets once a year in various locations throughout the United States. The meeting is generally held in November and is open to the public. The B5 Technical Committees usually meet in conjunction with the B5 Standards Committee. Some B5 Technical Committees also meet separately in different locations throughout the year. The B5 Standards Committee and its Technical Committees are composed of experts in the field of machine tools. Members of the B5 Standards Committee are classified in the following interest classes: Producer/Manufacturer, Regulatory, Services, General Interest, and User. The B5 Committee works on writing new ASME American National Standards, and revising current ASME B5 and B94 standards. The B5 Standards Committee operates under procedures of the American National Standards Institute (ANSI).

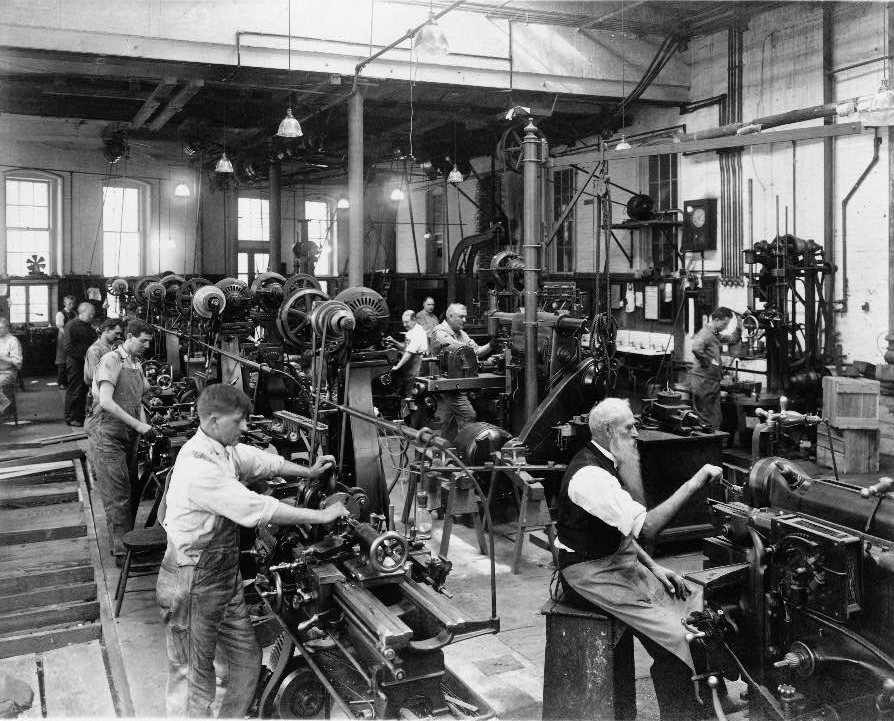
Turn of the Century Machine Shop

== History ==
The celebration of the 100th meeting in 2022 will mark the 100th consecutive year the ASME B5 committee has met. The following historical information marks only the beginning stages of copious collaborative work and continuous publication, review, and revision of ASME B5 Standards.

On May 13, 1914, the ASME Committee on Meetings, Subcommittee on Machine Shop Practice began discussion on standardization of machine shop practices. It wasn't until September 1922 under the procedure of American Standards Association, the B5 committee was organized as a committee dedicated to machine tools. B5 was sponsored by the National Machine Tool Builders’ Association, the Society of Automotive Engineers, Metal Cutting Tool Institute, and The American Society of Mechanical Engineers.

On December 2, 1937, the standard for Adjustable Adapters for Multiple Spindle Drilling Heads this standard was approved by the American Standards Association and designated as American Standard (ASA B5.11-1937).

Work on the standardization of T-slots started in 1924 and a tentative standard was published in 1927. The first official American Standard for T-slots came in 1941. B5 Technical Committee No. 11 was organized in New York on December 4, 1928, and B5 Technical Committee No. 4 on Spindle Noses was organized on December 5, 1928. These two committees worked in close cooperation with each other and with manufacturers and users of engine lathes, turret lathes and automatic lathes in developing standards for spindle noses and chucks.

B5 Technical Committee No. 3 on the Standardization of Machine Tapers was appointed in August, 1926, and held its organization meeting in September, 1926, in New Haven, Conn. Three American tapers then in use, the Brown & Sharpe (1860), Morse (1862), and Jarno (1889), and the taper series adopted by William Sellers & Co.(1862) were combined into a compromise standard series which contained twenty-two (22) self-holding taper sizes.

The first edition of the Spindle Noses and Tool Shanks for Milling Machines standard, known as B5.18-1943, resulted from intensive effort dating back to 1926 by a special group of milling machine manufacturers.

The effort to establish an American standard for Ball Screws began in July 1971 out of a need to obtain a consensus opinion relative to proposals for standardization of ball screw assemblies within the ISO/TC39 sub-committee Working Group 7. Out of this, the subcommittee TC43 was organized with members representing manufacturers, users of ball screws, and others of general interest. TC43 produced ANSI B5.48, which was approved as an American National Standard and published in 1977.

== Charter ==
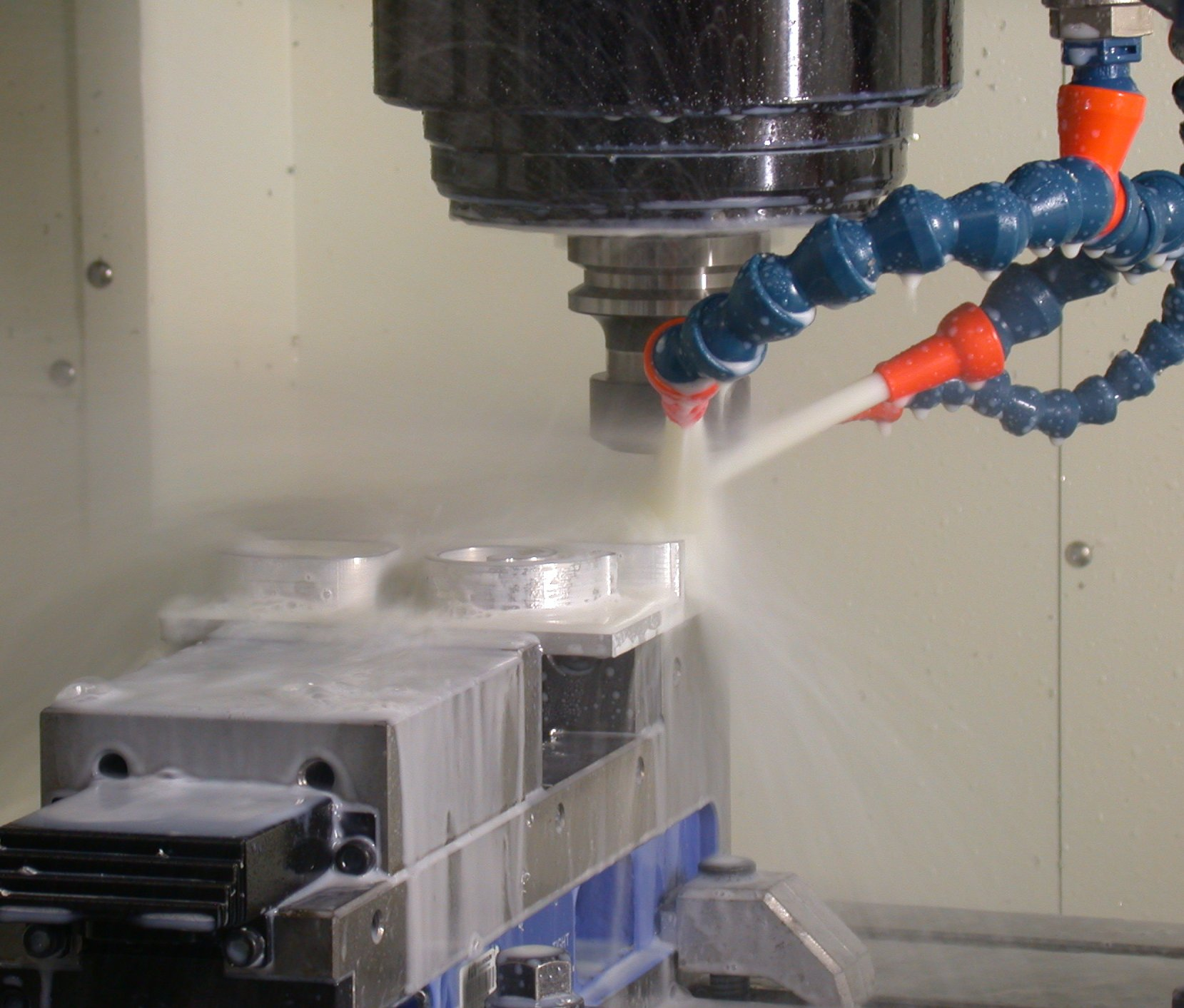
Machining Center

The charter of the ASME B5 Machine Tool Standards committee is "The standardization of machine tools, cutting tools and of the elements of machine tool construction and operation relating primarily to their use in manufacturing operations, including:

- Work and tool holding elements
- Driving mechanisms that constitute an inherent part of the machine tool
- Components and associated appurtenances
- Nomenclature, designations, sizes, and capacities
- Tests for accuracy of machine tools and of work and tool holding parts or elements
- Movements and adjustments of machine tool elements
- Parts and elements for adjusting, guiding, and aligning work or tools, including slots and tapes, but excluding, punches, dies and screw taps."

== Technical subcommittees ==
Technical subcommittees under ASME B5 address the formulation and maintenance of standards in particular disciplines within the scope of the B5 charter. Membership includes a carefully balanced representation in various interest classifications so that no one group dominates. Some examples of the various interest classifications are: users, manufacturers, consultants, insurance interests, universities, testing laboratories, and government regulatory agencies.

There are over 40 Standards that are periodically reviewed to ensure they reflect new developments and technical advances (e.g., new materials, new designs and new applications). Several new standards are under development or being considered in the areas of Tool Holder Interfaces, Machine Performance Evaluation, Micromachining, Energy Assessment, and Robotics. The current list (2015) of B5 subcommittees includes:

TC 11 - Chucks and Chuck Jaws

TC 30 - Power Press Standards

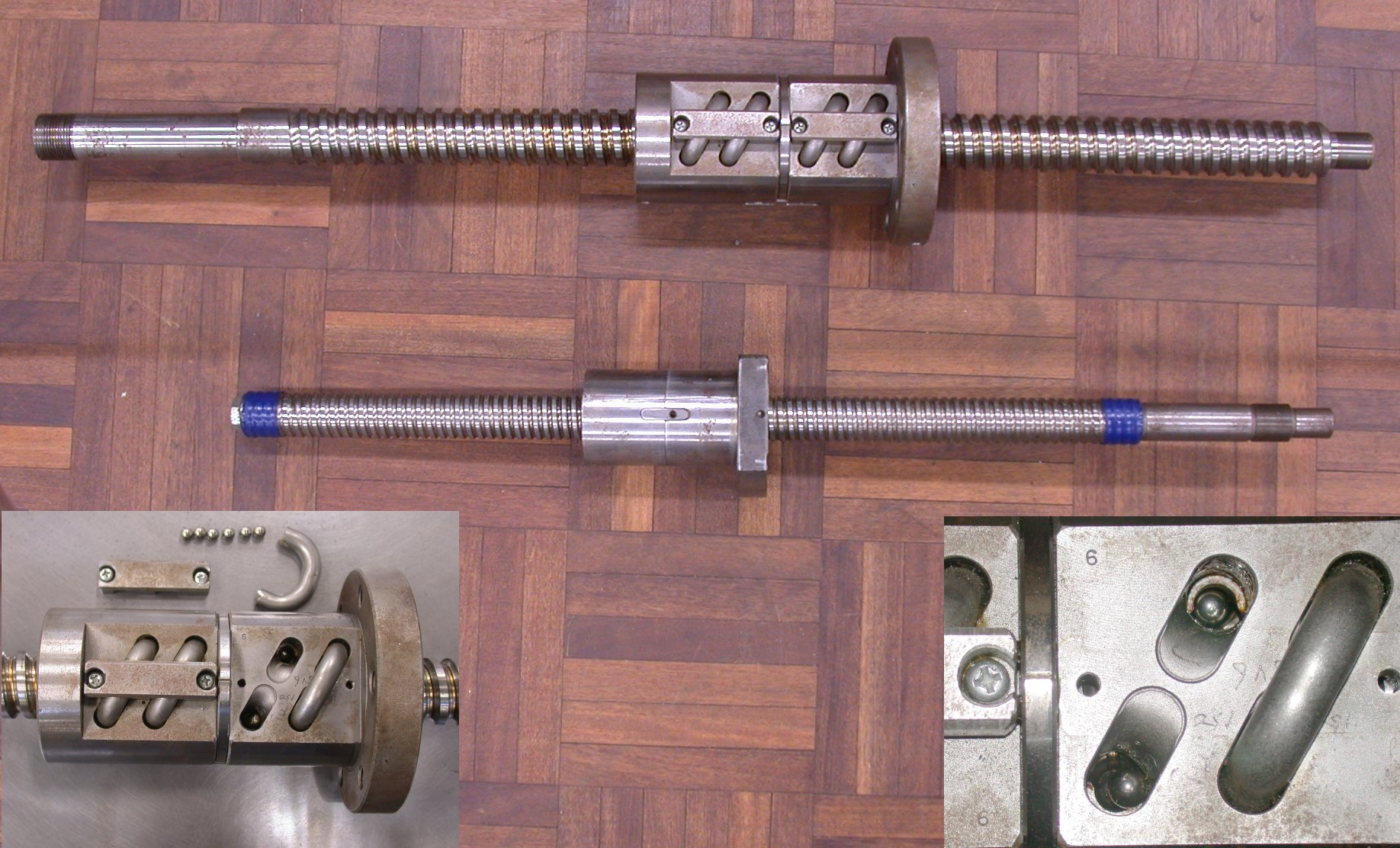
Typical Ball Screw

TC 43 - Ball Screws

TC 45 - Spindle Noses and Tool Shanks for Machining Centers

TC 52 - Machine Tool Performance

TC 54 - Tool Connection Gages for Machine Tools

TC 55 - Tool Identification Systems (RFID)

TC 56 - Information Technology for Machine Tools

TC 65- Micromachining

TC 94 - Cutting Tools

=== ASME B5 also provides the ANSI-sanctioned Technical Advisory Groups to ISO regarding machine tool technology. These include ===
==== Technical Advisory to ISO TC39 Machine Tools ====
ISO TC39, SC2 – Test conditions for metal cutting machine tools

ISO TC39, SC4 – Woodworking machines

ISO TC39, SC6 – Noise of machine tools

ISO TC39, SC8 – Work holding spindles and chucks

ISO TC39, SC10 – Safety

ISO TC39, WG 7 – Ball screws

ISO TC39, WG9 – Symbols for indications appearing on machine tools

ISO TC39, WG 12 – Environmental evaluation of machine tools

ISO TC39, WG 16 – Production equipment for Microsystems

==== Technical Advisory to ISO TC29 ====
ISO TC29, SC2 – Cutting tools and their attachments
