= Drawbar (machine tool) =

Clamping mechanism

A W-type external-thread collet (red) being pulled into its spindle seat (green) with a drawbar (blue), clamping and then releasing a shaft.

A drawbar or spindle drawbar is a clamping mechanism for tool/workholders on machine tools. The toolholder or machine taper itself is held by the draw bar and applies force to the spindle, especially when spinning at low speeds.

== Drawbar pull ==
The drawbar pull is an important component that allows the machine to keep the tool or work in place while it’s being used. The force from the drawbar pull has to be just right because not enough force would cause the tool to spin or wobble leading to inaccuracy, and too much force would apply excessive stress, leading to shorter tool life. Regularly checking the drawbar pull using a drawbar force gauge ensures the spindle and tool stay in tune so that your machine stays running efficiently.

== Drawbar materials ==
Choosing the right material for a drawbar is important because the milling machine needs high durability. Some commonly used materials are High carbon steel, Stress-proof steel, Heat-treated alloy steel, and Black oxide steel.

- High Carbon Steel - Used for its strength and durability, this material can survive through the wear and tear applied by the drawbar.
- Stress Proof Steel - Known to be more adaptable under high stress and corrosion resistant this material is a reliable option for a drawbar.
- Heat Treated Alloy Steel - Providing a drawbar with more strength by being resistant and flexible this material is used in many milling machines within the industry.
- Black Oxide Steel - When looking for a drawbar material that adds an extra layer of protection this material is the one because this steel has a coating of black oxide that provides a thicker more resistant aspect that slows corrosion.

== Types of drawbars ==
=== Threaded drawbars ===
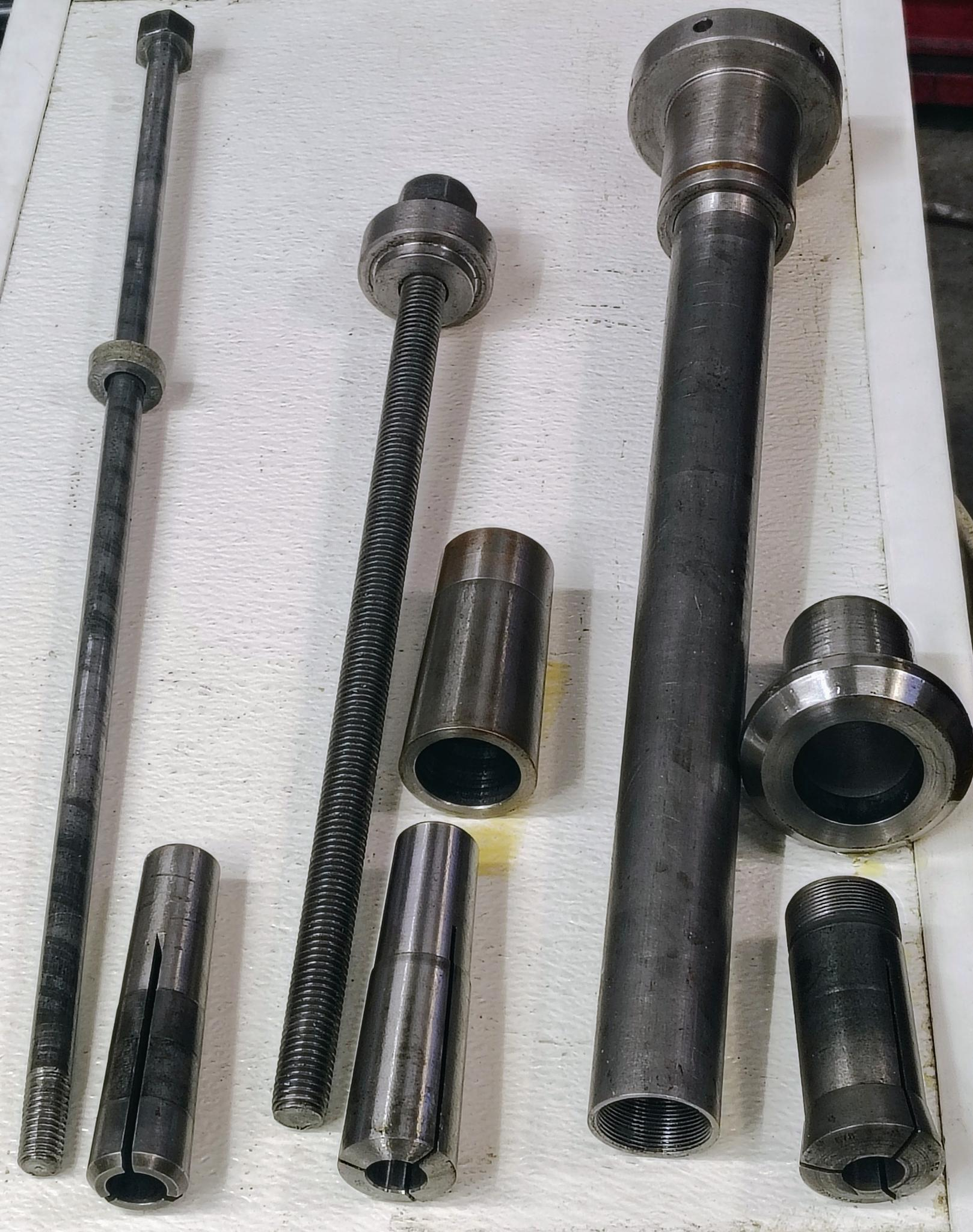
BS9 (Left) Mill, MT4 (Middle) Lathe, 5C (right) from lathe; Threaded Drawbars/and Collet Closer, each with 5/8" Collet and Spindle Adapter (if used)

Threaded drawbars are used on milling machines, Industrial grinders and lathes. The threaded drawbar requires the operator to use a wrench or spanner, and sometimes a hammer to perform some twisting and tapping so the cutting tool can be removed.

=== Power drawbars ===
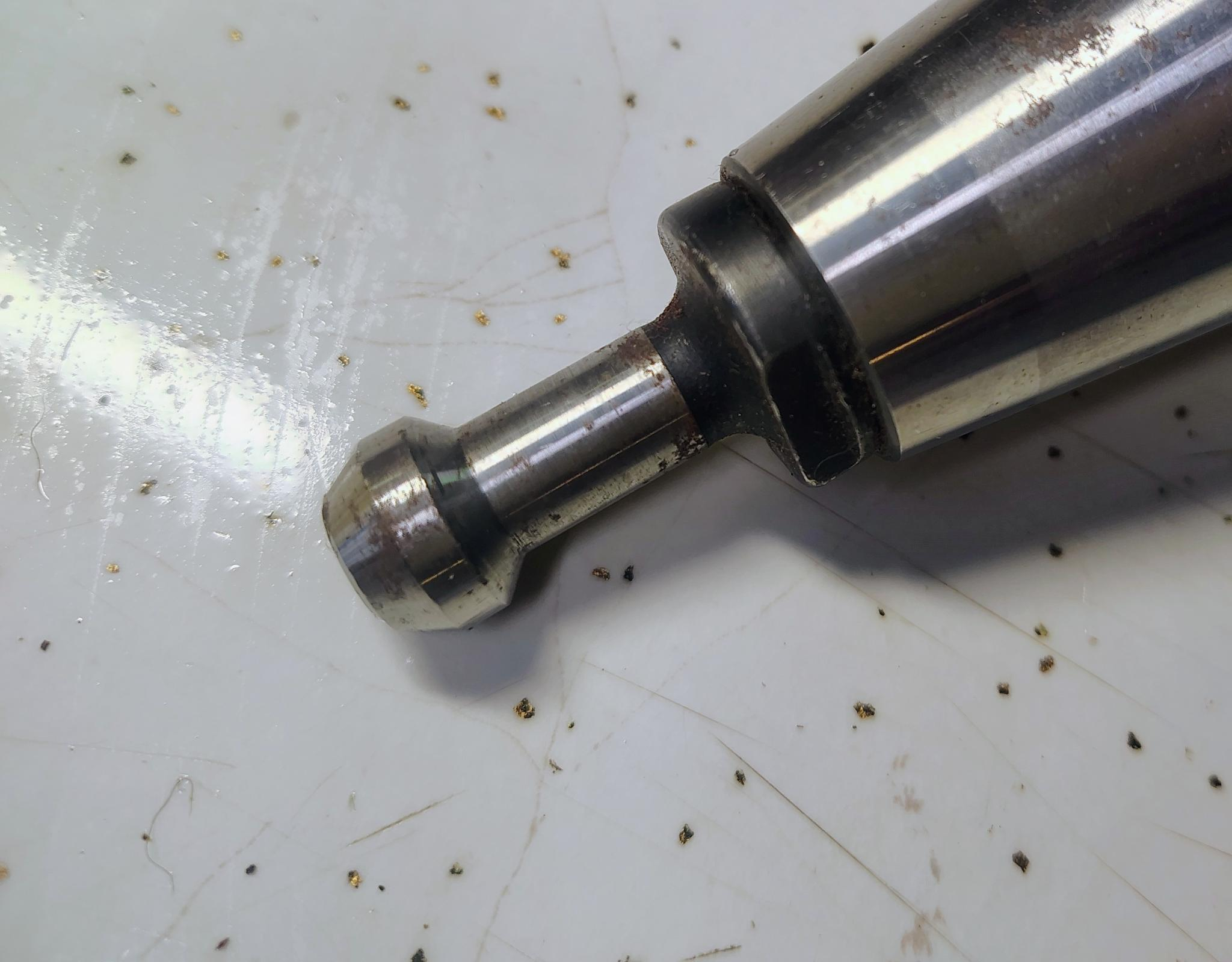
Pull Stud (aka Retention Knob) Shown threaded into a (Partially Visible) CAT 40 taper

Power drawbars are starting to become more popular in milling machines because they are a fully automated version of the drawbar. They work by using compressed air to tighten and loosen the spindle giving the operator an easy way to change tools. This type of drawbar grasps a Pull Stud, aka Retention Knob on a Machine Taper, such as a collet

== Choosing the right drawbar ==
Choosing the right drawbar is important when setting up a milling machine. The right drawbar can be the difference between a good or bad milling machine by affecting its lifespan and efficiency. When choosing a drawbar, some things to consider include:

- Fit- Making sure that a drawbar fits properly in the milling machine is always important because a poor fit will damage the drawbar and how the machine performs.
- Material- A selection of drawbar materials can be used for different operations, so picking the drawbar material for the end goal of the milling machine is more than necessary.
- Install and Maintenance- Installing a drawbar needs to be efficient and the maintenance on the drawbar needs to be easy to understand and done often to keep the milling machine in order.

== See also ==
- Drawbar force gauge
- Milling machine
- Machine tools
