= History of Connecticut industry =

The evolution of U.S. manufacturing and the American industrial revolution are clearly reflected in the history of Connecticut. Between the birth of the U.S. patent system in 1790 and 1930, Connecticut had more patents issued per capita than any other state; in the 19th century, when one in three thousand people were issued a U.S. patent, one in 700-1000 Connecticut inventors were issued patents. Connecticut's first recorded invention granted a U.S. patent was a lapidary machine, by Abel Buell of Killingworth, in 1765.

== Pre-industrialization ==
As most early American colonies, Connecticut was an agrarian economy with pockets of manufacturing centered in market towns, producing goods for local markets. However by the late 1700s, the region was also known for cabinet and furniture making, originating the Queen Anne and Chippendale styles, produced by an influx of skilled immigrant artisans from England and Scotland who setup workshops throughout the colony. Plentiful natural resources, including water for power, wood for fires and building material, and iron ore, combined with excellent natural harbors, and navigable rivers leading all the way to Massachusetts, quickly led to the area becoming a center for colonial trade and overseas exports.

As in most of New England, the residents believed that industry, in all senses of the word, not only strengthened individual moral fiber, but also served to make the colony independent and free to pursue its own religious and philosophical beliefs. While manual labor was valued, learning and study was also prized and many schools were founded, with Yale University the most significant. The development by Eli Whitney of the system of precision manufacturing of interchangeable parts and the assembly line in the late 18th century, however made Connecticut into a major center of manufacturing. This development changed "made in the United States" from a phrase connoting shoddy workmanship and expensive maintenance, into a world standard for high quality, and the entire system became known as the American system of manufacturing.

In the late 18th century, the Connecticut government engaged in financial incentives for building and operating textile mills.

The Connecticut Valley (Wethersfield, East Windsor, and Colchester) was a center of cabinetmaking and furniture construction in the latter half of the 18th century. Beginning in the Queen Anne style, by the end of the period the furniture had evolved into four distinct variations of the Chippendale style; that of Eliphalet Chapin, one of the masters of the craft, who tended to produce pieces which were more compact and chunky in appearance, incorporating some of the Philadelphia rococo style without as much fussiness; that of the Colchester/Norwich area, exemplified by Samuel Loomis, as well as those of the Wethersfield and Springfield–Northampton areas.

== 19th century (1800s) ==
Between 1800 and 1860, Connecticut manufacturers applied the system to the manufacture of economically priced high quality firearms, leading to Connecticut's nickname "the arsenal of democracy." This all started in 1797 when Eli Whitney began to manufacture weapons, later the Connecticut Valley Arms company. Middletown, Connecticut was the major supplier of pistols to the United States government during the War of 1812, with numerous gun manufacturers in the area. In 1810, Oliver Bidwell built the first pistol factory in the United States on the Pameacha River in Middletown, winning a contract with the United States War Department for handmade pistols. Also in 1810, Colonel Simeon North built a pistol factory in Middletown on the West River, now the Coginchaug River, also winning a contract from the United States Secretary of War, which led to enlarging his factory to 8,500 square feet (790 m^{2}); he built about 10,000 pistols a year, up until just before the Civil War, designing America's first milling machine. Even more successful was Colonel Nathan Starr Jr., whose factory (built of stone quarried from the river) was about the same size as North's, and located across the river half a mile northeast. Starr initially manufactured swords, about 5,000 a year; including presentation swords for the state of Tennessee and War of 1812 heroes, colonel Richard M. Johnson, General Edmond P. Gaines, and General Andrew Jackson. The factory later manufactured muskets and rifles until 1845, after which the United States government started government armories in Massachusetts and West Virginia partially modeled after Starr's. In 1812, John R. Johnson and John D. Johnson built a factory, also on the Pameacha River. Robert and John D. Johnson manufactured Model 1817 common rifles in 1821 to 1827. After this period, firearm manufacturing declined in Middletown but briefly revived during the Civil War. The Savage Revolving Fire Arm Company manufactured pistols between 1859 and 1866, and the Sage Ammunition Works manufactured ammunition between 1864 and 1867.

In 1836, Samuel Colt invented the revolver design which continues to be used to this day. Colt's Manufacturing Company hired Elisha K. Root to modernize production, making Colt weapons the first in the world with truly interchangeable parts. Horace Smith and Daniel B. Wesson designed the first repeating rifle in Norwich in the early 1850s, which went into production by the New Haven Arms Company (which later became the Winchester Repeating Arms Company), and, just across the border in Massachusetts, the Springfield Armory. Smith also patented a metallic rifle cartridge in 1854. Christian Sharps designed the Sharps breech-loading rifle which in 1854 began to be manufactured in Hartford by the Sharps Rifle Manufacturing Company. Christopher Spencer designed the Spencer repeating rifle which played an important role for Union troops at the Battle of Gettysburg.

Another area where precision manufacture led to industrial dominance for Connecticut was in the manufacture of clocks, watches, and other timepieces, by Eli Terry and his apprentice Seth Thomas, the Forestville Manufacturing Company (which became the E. N. Welch Company), the New England Clock Company, the Ansonia Clock Company, Gilbert Clocks, Ingraham Clocks, the New Haven Clock Company, Welch Clocks, Sessions Clocks, and the Waterbury Clock Company, which became Timex Group USA, and is the sole Connecticut survivor of this once flourishing field, now decimated by lower costs of production elsewhere, in the United States and overseas. The American Clock and Watch Museum is located in Bristol, Connecticut.

Similarly, Connecticut industry became well known in allied fields. Hardware and tools continue to be manufactured by The Stanley Works and Stanley Rule & Level Co. in New Britain. Connecticut was a major area for development and manufacture of machine tools. In 1818, Simeon North designed America's first milling machine. Machinist Elisha Root first designed machinery for the Collins Company of Collinsville which manufactured axes which became world-famous, then was hired by Colt in 1849 to modernize firearm production by designing precision drop hammers, boring machines, gauges, jig (tool)s, etc., and improving the milling machines designed by Francis A. Pratt for the George S. Lincoln company in Hartford; the resulting Lincoln miller became world-famous, selling over 150,000 machines. Another Colt engineer, William Mason, patented 125 inventions for manufacture of firearms, as well as steam pumps and power looms. Christopher Spencer invented the automatic turret lathe (which in its small- to medium-sized form is known as a screw machine) for machining screws, as well as the variable cam cylinder used to control the turret. Francis A. Pratt and Amos Whitney invented a thread milling machine in 1865; Whitney also perfected various measurement instruments, and Pratt designed the aforementioned original milling machine manufactured by the George S. Lincoln company of Hartford. Simon Fairman invented the lathe chuck in West Stafford in 1830, and his son-in-law, Austin F. Cushman, invented the self-centering Cushman Universal Chuck in 1862. Edward P. Bullard designed the vertical boring mill in 1883. Charles E. Billings perfected the drop hammer for metal forging in the 1870s and designed the copper commutator central to the operation of electrical generators and motors. Edwin R. Fellows of Torrington in 1896 designed and built a new type of gear shaper and founded the Fellows Gear Shaper Company, which made a vital contribution to the manufacture of effective and reliable gear transmissions for the nascent automotive industry. The name Bridgeport on machine tools continues to be a guarantee of high quality around the world, for people who have no idea that the machinery is named after a city in Connecticut. Even the world of toys was dominated by the A. C. Gilbert Company, manufacturers of Erector Sets as well as other educational toys such as chemistry sets, microscopes, toy trains, etc.

Another area of industry where Connecticut excelled was in bicycle manufacturing, and its spin-off, the earliest automobile manufacturing. Albert Pope of Hartford saw a bicycle in Philadelphia in 1876 and was immediately enthralled with the concept of an "ever-saddled horse that eats nothing and requires no care." He subsequently began the first bicycle manufacturing in America, Columbia Bicycles, and set about marketing the vehicle, setting up a system of distributorships with fixed prices, hiring doctors to tout cycling as healthy exercise, and founding cycling magazines. When the safety bicycle was developed in the 1880s, he was in a perfect position to benefit from the subsequent craze.

Connecticut also became an innovative leader in the shipbuilding industry. The first recorded steam powered boat in America was built by South Windsor's John Fitch in 1786. The first military submarine, the Turtle, was built in Connecticut in 1775 by David Bushnell; since then, Connecticut has remained a world leader in the manufacture of these specialized ships. Simon Lake produced submarines for the US Navy in Bridgeport, beginning in 1913, and the work done by John P. Holland led to submarine production by the Electric Boat Company in Groton beginning in 1924, which continues to this day.

== 20th century (1900s) ==
The advent of lend-lease in support of Britain helped lift Connecticut from the Great Depression, with the state a major production center for weaponry and supplies used in World War II. Connecticut manufactured 4.1% of total U.S. military armaments produced during the war, ranking ninth among the 48 states, with major factories including Colt[90] for firearms, Pratt & Whitney for aircraft engines, Chance Vought for fighter planes, Hamilton Standard for propellers, and Electric Boat for submarines and PT boats.

On May 13, 1940, Igor Sikorsky made an untethered flight of the first practical helicopter. The helicopter saw limited use in World War II, but future military production made Sikorsky Aircraft's Stratford plant Connecticut's largest single manufacturing site by the start of the 21st century.
