= Rotary hammer =

Type of rotary drill

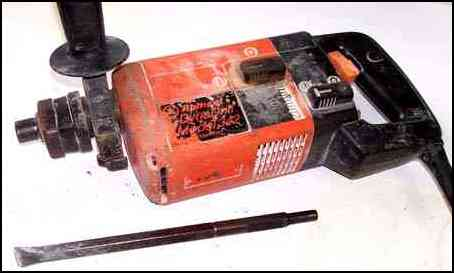
Ramset 342 Dyna Drill and Chipping Hammer, shown with chipping chisel.

A rotary hammer, also called rotary hammer drill is a power tool that can perform heavy-duty tasks such as drilling and chiseling hard materials. It is similar to a hammer drill in that it also pounds the drill bit in and out while it is spinning. However, rotary hammers use a piston mechanism instead of a special clutch. This causes them to deliver a much more powerful hammer blow, making it possible to drill bigger holes much faster. Most rotary hammers have three settings: drill mode, hammer drill or just hammer, so they can act as a mini jackhammer.

== Function ==
Compared to less advanced power units known as hammer drills, rotary hammers tend to be larger and provide a bigger impact force by using a technology called the "electro-pneumatic" (EP) hammering mechanism, because it is powered directly by electricity instead of a separate air compressor. Rotary hammers have two pistons – a drive piston, and a flying piston. An electric motor turns a crank, which moves the drive piston back and forth in a cylinder. The flying piston is at the other end of the same cylinder. The pistons do not actually touch, but the air pressure in the EP cylinder allows for a much more efficient transfer of hammering energy than springs in the cam-action style hammer drills. The majority of modern rotary hammers as well as all electric-powered chipping guns or jack-hammers all use this EP technology. Modern units allow the hammer and rotation functions to be used separately or in combination, i.e., hammer mode, drill mode, or both. When used in the hammer mode, the tool provides a drilling function similar to a jackhammer. Rotary hammer drills have an oil filled gearbox, which allows them to operate durably despite the large forces and shocks they receive and the grit-filled environments where they are often used.

The type of work they do means that they require a "slip-clutch" which engages when the drill bit jams and sufficient torque is put onto the "slip-clutch" mechanism. This stops the violent wrenching motion that a drill without a clutch would cause when stopped suddenly from full speed, protecting the drill from damage. The slip-clutch also protects the operator, but does not always prevent injury. Some manufacturers have introduced additional technology to protect the operator. Hilti has a technology called "ATC" or "Active Torque Control" which works by disengaging the drive from the motor when the tool body begins to rotate excessively through the action of a secondary magnetic clutch in addition to the standard slip-clutch. DeWALT has a related system called "CTC" or "Complete Torque Control" which uses a two-position slip-clutch so that the operator can select the lower torque setting for greater safety.

A number of "special shanks" have been developed by various manufacturers. Over the years a fair number of these proprietary systems evolved, but the remaining shanks in use today are: SDS+, SDS-MAX, and SPLINE SHANK. These shanks were developed in order to allow for the bit to "slide" back and forth while rotating, so that the drill bit can efficiently transfer the force of the electro-pneumatic hammering mechanism to the working surface.

== Use ==
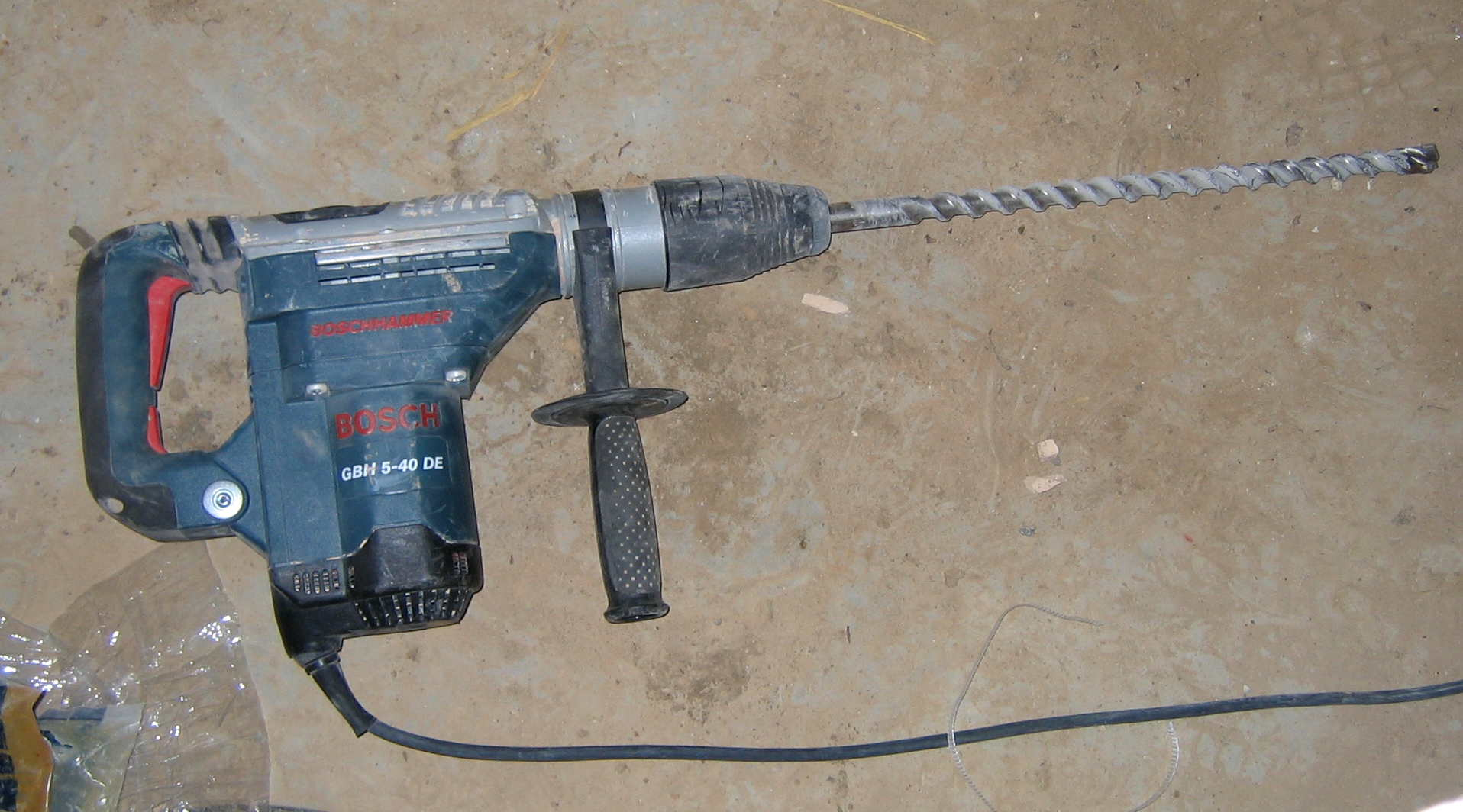
A rotary hammer drill used in construction

Rotary hammers can be used for "doweling" (repetitive drilling of large rebar anchor holes), and drilling through-holes in concrete and masonry walls. The hammering action helps break up the masonry so that it can be removed by the drill bit's flutes. Apart from their main function of drilling concrete, the rotary action can be switched off and just the percussive force used. Chisel and point accessories are used for small chipping jobs.

=== Special chuck ===
Worn masonry drill bit having a Slotted Drive Shaft (SDS)

Rotary hammers have such force that the usual masonry drill bits are not adequate. Their smooth shanks would be pounded loose from the tool's chuck in a few seconds. Rotary hammers require special bits with an SDS shank (which can stand for Slotted Drive Shaft or Special Direct System), which locks into the rotary hammer without the need for a chuck. The hammer strikes the bit directly, instead of the chuck holding the bit.

=== Jams ===
Jams are most often caused by hitting reinforcing steel or by a worn bit. In both cases the drill must be disengaged from the bit and the jammed bit backed out of the hole with vise grips or monkey wrench. Some bits use a full carbide "four-cutter" head with a geometry that makes jamming less common - even when rebar is present. These full-carbide "four-cutter" bits can even, in some instances, drill through rebar, although this should be done with caution. A worn drill bit will still drill a horizontal hole, although of a slightly smaller diameter than one created when it was new. When a drill like this is used to drill holes down into a concrete slab, the flutes are so worn that they can no longer lift the dust out of the hole; the concrete dust packs up in the hole and jams the bit.

== History ==
Hilti had the first "electro-pneumatic" rotary hammer on the market in 1967, the Hilti TE 17

== Types ==
The perforating devices differ, basically, depending on the intended use, which leads to the appropriate size, weight and impact force when applied:

- Relatively light electric punches (less than 10 kg) are prevalent in the construction field and the DIY market.
- Pneumatic perforators are used in mining industry and highway construction.
- Hydraulic hammers demonstrate the highest performance and weight (150 kg or more).

Operation of perforating equipment is associated with much noise. Only in the last 20 years it became possible to decrease the noise level to about 100 dB(A); earlier levels over 125 dB(A) were common.
