= Pneumatic drill =

A pneumatic drill may refer to a:

- Jackhammer, a tool used to break up rock and pavement
- Drill, run by compressed air
