= Arrow cresting =

A cresting machine (also called an arrow-cresting machine, an arrow-crester, or simply a crester) is a machine that aids in the adding of coloured lines called cresting to arrows in order to identify the fletcher. Cresting machines are small lathes that consist of a chuck and an engine attached to a board. Cresting machines do not paint the arrows themselves but are rather jigs that rotate the arrows uniformly so that a separate steadily held paintbrush can paint the cresting accurately.
