= Hammer drill =

Power tool

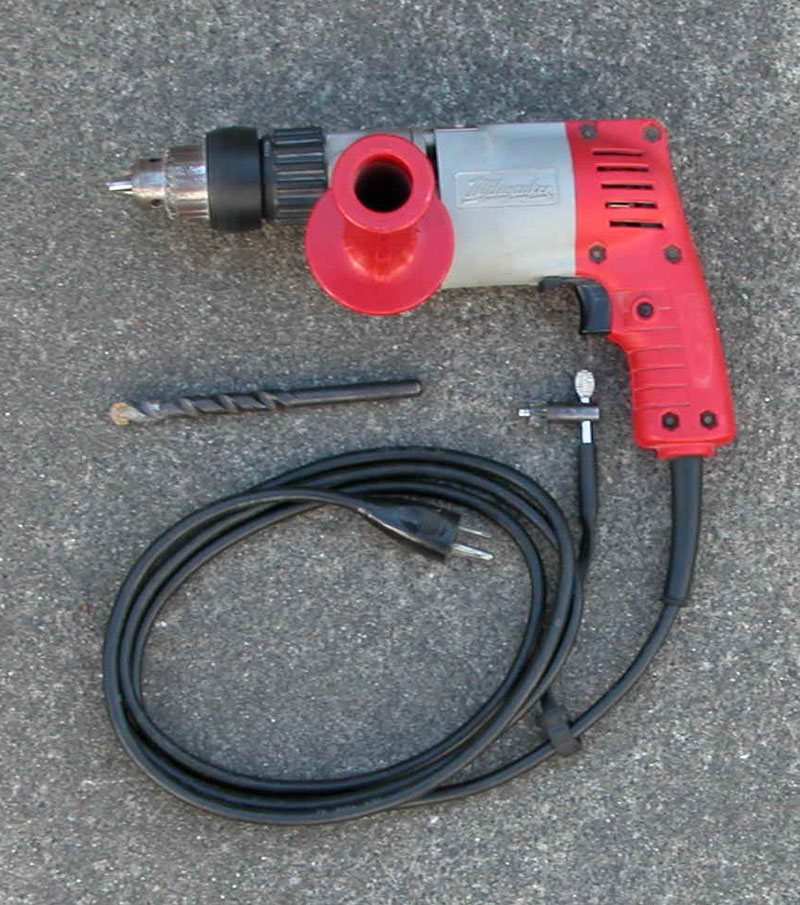
A corded hammer drill next to a drill bit and a chuck key

A hammer drill, also known as a percussion drill or impact drill, is a power tool used chiefly for drilling in hard materials. It is a type of rotary drill with an impact mechanism that generates a hammering motion. The percussive mechanism provides a rapid succession of short hammer thrusts to pulverize the material to be bored, so as to provide quicker drilling with less effort. If a hammer drill's impact mechanism can be switched off, the tool can be used like a conventional drill to also perform tasks such as screwdriving.

== History ==
Ancient China's principal drilling technique, percussive drilling, was invented during the Han dynasty. The process involved two to six men jumping on a lever at rhythmic intervals to raise a heavy iron bit attached to long bamboo cables from a bamboo derrick. Utilizing cast iron bits and tools constructed of bamboo, the early Chinese were able to use percussion drilling to drill holes to a depth of 3,000 ft (910 m). The construction of large wells took more than two to three generations of workers to complete. The cable tool drilling machines developed by the early Chinese involved raising and dropping a heavy string of drilling tools to crush through rocks into diminutive fragments. In addition, the Chinese also used a cutting head secured to bamboo rods to drill to depths of 915 m (3,002 ft). The raising and dropping of the bamboo drill strings allowed the drilling machine to penetrate less dense and unconsolidated rock formations.

In 1848 J.J. Couch invented the first pneumatic percussion drill.

The origin of the first hammer drill is a matter of contention. German company Fein patented a Bohrmaschine mit elektro-pneumatischem Schlagwerk ("drill with electro-pneumatic striking mechanism") in 1914. German company Bosch produced the first "Bosch-Hammer" around 1932 in mass production. The US company Milwaukee Electric Tool Corporation states that in 1935, it was selling a lightweight 1/4 in (6.4 mm) electric hammer drill (cam-action).

Hand-cranked percussion drills were made in the UK in the mid-twentieth century.

In the late nineteenth century and early twentieth century, mining engineer J. George Leyner developed hammer drills for use in mining. Leyner's designs provided improved efficiency and worker safety. These mining drills became the industry standard.

== Design ==
Hammer drills have a cam-action or percussion hammering mechanism, in which two sets of toothed gears mechanically interact with each other to hammer while rotating the drill bit. With cam-action drills, the chuck has a mechanism whereby the entire chuck and bit move forward and backward on the axis of rotation.

This type of drill is often used with or without the hammer action, but it is not possible to use the hammer action alone as it is the rotation over the cams which causes the hammer motion. A hammer drill has a specially designed clutch that allows it to not only spin the drill bit, but also to punch it in and out (along the axis of the bit).

The actual distance the bit travels in and out and the force of its blow are both very small, and the hammering action is very rapid—thousands of "BPM" (blows per minute) or "IPM" (impacts per minute). Although each blow is of relatively low force, these thousands of blows per minute are more than adequate to break up concrete or brick, using the masonry drill bit's carbide wedge to pulverize it for the spiral flutes to whisk away.

For this reason, a hammer drill drills much faster than a regular drill through concrete, brick, and thick lumber. In standardized drilling speed tests, the most effective hammer drills improve drilling speeds by upwards of 30% compared to completing the same task with the hammer mode disabled.

== Uses ==
Holes in hard materials are needed for anchor bolts, concrete screws, and wall plugs. Hammer drills are not typically used for production construction drilling, but rather for occasional drilling of holes into concrete, masonry or stone. They are also used to drill holes in concrete footings to pin concrete wall forms and to drill holes in concrete floors to pin wall framing. Slotted drive shaft or slotted drive system (SDS) rotary drills are more commonly used as dedicated masonry drilling tools in construction. The system was designed by Bosch in 1975 and stands for "Stecken – Drehen – Sichern" which is German for "Insert – Twist – Secure".

Hammer drills almost always have a lever or switch that locks off the special "hammer clutch," turning the tool into a conventional drill for wood or metal work. Hammer drills are both more expensive and bulkier than regular drills, but are preferable for applications where the material to be drilled, concrete block or wood studs, is unknown. For example, an electrician mounting an electrical box to a wall would be able to use the same hammer drill to drill into either wood studs (hammer disabled) or masonry walls (hammer enabled).

== See also ==
- Rotary hammer – Type of rotary drill
