= J. George Leyner =

American inventor and mining engineer

John George Leyner
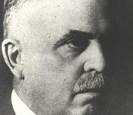
- Born: August 26, 1860; Boulder County, Colorado, US
- Died: August 3, 1920 (aged 59); Denver, Colorado, US
- Occupation(s): Mining engineer and inventor
- Organization: J. George Leyner Engineering Works Company
- Known for: Inventions for the mining industry including enhanced safety

Signature
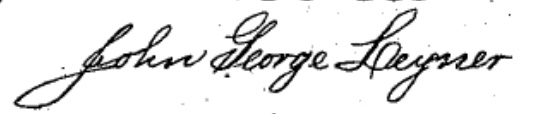

J. George Leyner (1860–1920) was a machinist who invented mining equipment that enhanced safe mining operations while also improving efficiency. He held a significant number of United States patents and established his own equipment manufacturing companies. In particular, he invented a drill that used water to suppress generation of airborne particles during mining, thereby reducing the risk of miners' developing silicosis. The device later became known as the Leyner drill.

== Biography ==
Leyner was born in Left Hand Canyon, Colorado. His parents were Mr. and Mrs. Peter A. Leyner. His father was a German immigrant, while his mother is believed to have been Pennsylvania Dutch. His parents' ranch is located in Boulder County, Colorado, and remains in the Leyner family. Leyner reportedly attended school only through eighth grade. As a youth, he lost his vision in one eye due to an explosion.

Leyner worked in various machine shops in the Colorado front range until he opened his own shop in 1891. His shop specialized in building mining equipment for the region. Building on his success, he established the J. George Leyner Engineering Works Company, based in Littleton, Colorado, in 1902. He was the first Colorado-born manufacturer of mining equipment.

Leyner's company benefited from financing from local businesspeople. As the company expanded, it moved its headquarters to Denver. At the same time, Leyner moved his residence to Denver. Beginning in 1912, the company used the Ingersol-Rand Company as the distributor of its products. The business relationship between the two companies became stronger over time, with engineers from Ingersol-Rand becoming involved in design of the Leyner Company's products. Finally, in 1932, the Leyner Company was acquired by Ingersol-Rand.

Later in his career, Leyner developed a strong interest in farming and ranching. He had acquired a ranch named Perry Park, near Larkspur, Colorado. The property was a vacation home for him and his family, and included a former hotel as the ranch house. During this time, Leyner experimented with farming and ranching. As a result, he became involved in the design and construction of farm equipment, especially tractors. In 1918, he founded the Leyner Tractor and Manufacturing Company. He sold the Perry Park property in 1919.

Leyner was married twice, and had children by each wife.

Leyner was interested in automobiles. He died in an automobile crash in Denver on August 3, 1920, the accident taking place in front of his place of business.

== Inventions and innovations ==
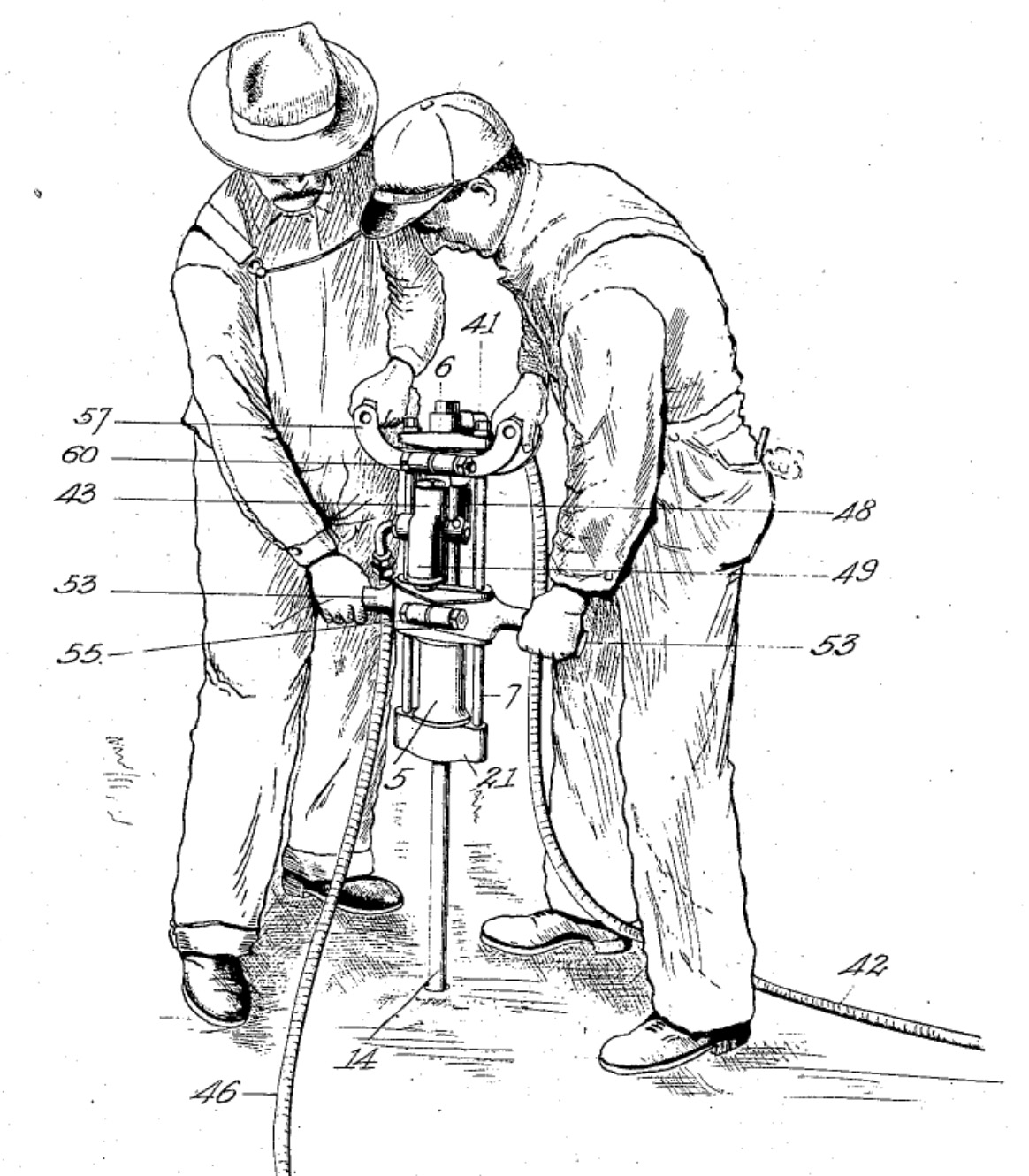
Mining drill in use as depicted in Leyner's patent US1039971

In 1897, Leyner began manufacturing a mining drill that improved mining efficiency by introducing a column of air into the bore hole to remove dust and debris. This product was not well-accepted by miners because of the cloud of dust generated by the air stream, exaggerating the miners' risk of silicosis. Recognizing this shortcoming, he later invented a mining drill that combined water into the air stream. The water suppressed generation of dust clouds, thereby reducing miners' dust exposure and improving miner safety. Leyner obtained a United States patent on this invention. The drill was widely accepted in the industry and became known as the Leyner drill.

Recognizing the difficulty resulting from his hammer type drill, Leyner recalled these drills so that they could be retrofitted with the devices that used water to suppress generation of mining dust.

Many states in the United States ultimately required use of mining drills of the Leyner design so as to provide suitable miner safety.

Among his other patented inventions related to mining, Leyner invented improvements to mining air compressors for powering drills, drill bit sharpening, and hoists used in mining operations. Besides safety improvements, his various inventions related to drills were also based on improved efficiency by using hammer drill designs. Leyner was the inventor on approximately 30 United States patents.

Later, as Leyner became interested in agriculture, he invented improvements to farm tractors, these being known as the Linapede. (Note: The name "Linapede" is reported to be a portmanteau of his second wife's given name, "Lina", and the word "centipede", which refers to the centipede-like design of the traction surfaces on the tractor. The tractor was characterized by high traction, good control, and low compaction of soil.) Leyner obtained United States patents on these improvements, including one that was issued posthumously.

Late in life, Leyner hand-crafted various large and ornate chairs out of a variety of wood types that he had collected. The chairs were not offered for commercial sale, but were for use by family members. At that time, he acquired a collection of roadsters and other high performance automobiles. Leyner also designed various bicycle frames and home laundry equipment.

== Honors and legacy ==
Leyner's mining inventions were awarded the grand prize at the Louisiana Purchase Exposition held in St. Louis, Missouri, in 1904.

Leyner was inducted into the National Mining Hall of Fame in 1990. (Note: The origin of the name of the town Leyner, Colorado, is uncertain and may not relate to J. George Leyner.)

A 1947 article in the British Journal of Industrial Medicine referred to Leyner as the "outstanding mechanical genius of the Rock Drill Industry".
