= Jackhammer =

Pneumatic tool

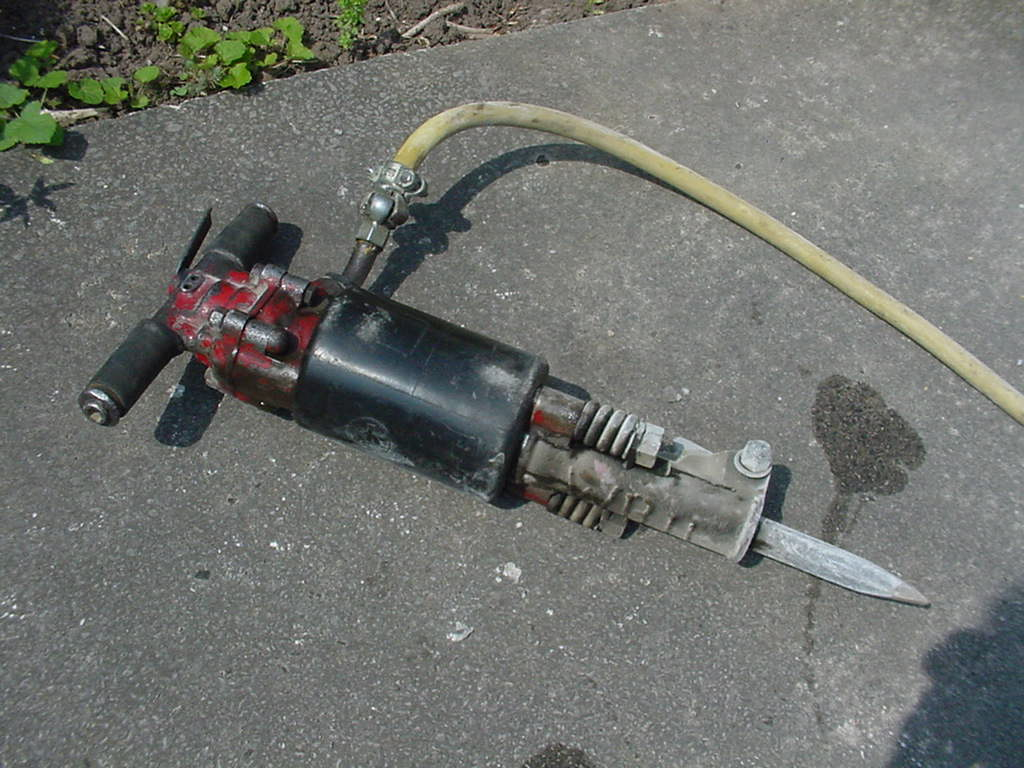
A pneumatic jackhammer

Video: A construction worker uses a jackhammer in Japan.

A jackhammer (pneumatic drill, breaker, demolition hammer or road hammer in Commonwealth English) is a pneumatic or electro-mechanical tool that combines a hammer directly with a chisel. It was invented by William McReavy, who then sold the patent to Charles Brady King. Hand-held jackhammers are generally powered by compressed air, but some are also powered by electric motors. Larger jackhammers, such as rig-mounted hammers used on construction machinery, are usually hydraulically powered. These tools are typically used to break up rock, pavement, and concrete.

A jackhammer operates by driving an internal hammer up and down. The hammer is first driven down to strike the chisel and then back up to return the hammer to the original position to repeat the cycle. The effectiveness of the jackhammer is dependent on how much force is applied to the tool. It is generally used like a hammer to break the hard surface or rock in construction works and it is not considered under earth-moving equipment, along with its accessories (i.e., pusher leg, lubricator).

== History ==
The first steam-powered drill was patented by Samuel Miller in 1806. The drill used steam only for raising the drill. Pneumatic drills were developed in response to the needs of mining, quarrying, excavating, and tunneling. A pneumatic drill was proposed by C. Brunton in 1844. In 1846, a percussion drill that could be worked by steam, or atmospheric pressure obtained from a vacuum, was patented in Britain by Thomas Clarke, Mark Freeman, and John Varley. The first American "percussion drill" was made in 1848, and patented in 1849 by Jonathan J. Couch of Philadelphia, Pennsylvania. In that drill, the drill bit passed through the piston of a steam engine. The piston snagged the drill bit and hurled it against the rock face. It was an experimental model. In 1849, Couch's assistant, Joseph W. Fowle, filed a patent caveat for a percussion drill of his own design. In Fowle's drill, the drill bit was connected directly to the piston in the steam cylinder; specifically, the drill bit was connected to the piston's crosshead. The drill also had a mechanism for turning the drill bit around its axis between strokes and for advancing the drill as the hole deepened. By 1850 or 1851, Fowle was using compressed air to drive his drill, making it the first true pneumatic drill.

The demand for pneumatic drills was driven especially by miners and tunnelers because steam engines needed fires to operate and the ventilation in mines and tunnels was inadequate to vent the fires' fumes. As well, mines and tunnels might contain flammable explosive gases such as methane. There was also no way to convey steam over long distances, such as from the surface to the bottom of a mine, without it condensing. By contrast, compressed air could be conveyed over long distances without loss of its energy, and after the compressed air had been used to power equipment, it could ventilate a mine or tunnel.

In Europe since the late 1840s, the king of Sardinia, Carlo Alberto, had been contemplating the excavation of a 12-kilometer (7.5 mi) tunnel through Mount Fréjus to create a rail link between Italy and France, which would cross his realm. The need for a mechanical rock drill was obvious and that sparked research in Europe on pneumatic rock drills. A Frenchman, François Cavé (fr), designed a rock drill that used compressed air, which he patented in 1851. However, the air had to be admitted manually to the cylinder during each stroke, so it was not successful.

In 1854, in England, Thomas Bartlett made and then patented (1855) a rock drill, the bit of which was connected directly to the piston of a steam engine. In 1855, Bartlett demonstrated his drill, powered by compressed air, to officials of the Mount Fréjus tunnel project. (In 1855, a German, Schumann, invented a similar pneumatic rock drill in Freiburg, Germany.) By 1861, Bartlett’s drill had been refined by the Savoy-born engineer Germain Sommeiller (1815-1871) and his colleagues, Grandis and Grattoni. Thereafter, many inventors refined the pneumatic drill. Sommeiller took his drill to the lengthy Gotthard Pass Tunnel, then being built to link railways between Switzerland and Italy under the Alps. From there, mining and railway tunnelling expanded.

Two equipment manufacturing companies, Atlas Copco and Ingersoll Rand, became dominant in the provision of compressed air drilling apparatus in Europe and America respectively, each holding significant patents.

== Terminology ==
The word "jackhammer" is used in North American English and Australia, while "pneumatic drill" is used colloquially elsewhere in the English-speaking world, although strictly speaking a "pneumatic drill" refers to a pneumatically driven jackhammer.

In Britain, electromechanical versions are colloquially known by the name of "Kangos". The term comes from the former British brand name now owned by Milwaukee Tools.

Additionally, the terms drill and breaker (demolition hammer) are non-interchangeable and refer to two distinct types of jackhammer (regardless of their power source). A breaker cannot rotate its steel (which for example may be either a chisel or spike) and relies on pure percussion shock to fracture and split material without cutting, whereas a (pneumatic/hydraulic) drill both impacts and rotates, which enables a steel with a tungsten carbide tipped bit to cut into hard rock such as granite, typically to create holes for blasting. Normally, only the pneumatic drill would be used at geological operations such as quarrying or mining and only the breaker at civil operations such as construction and road repair.

== Use ==
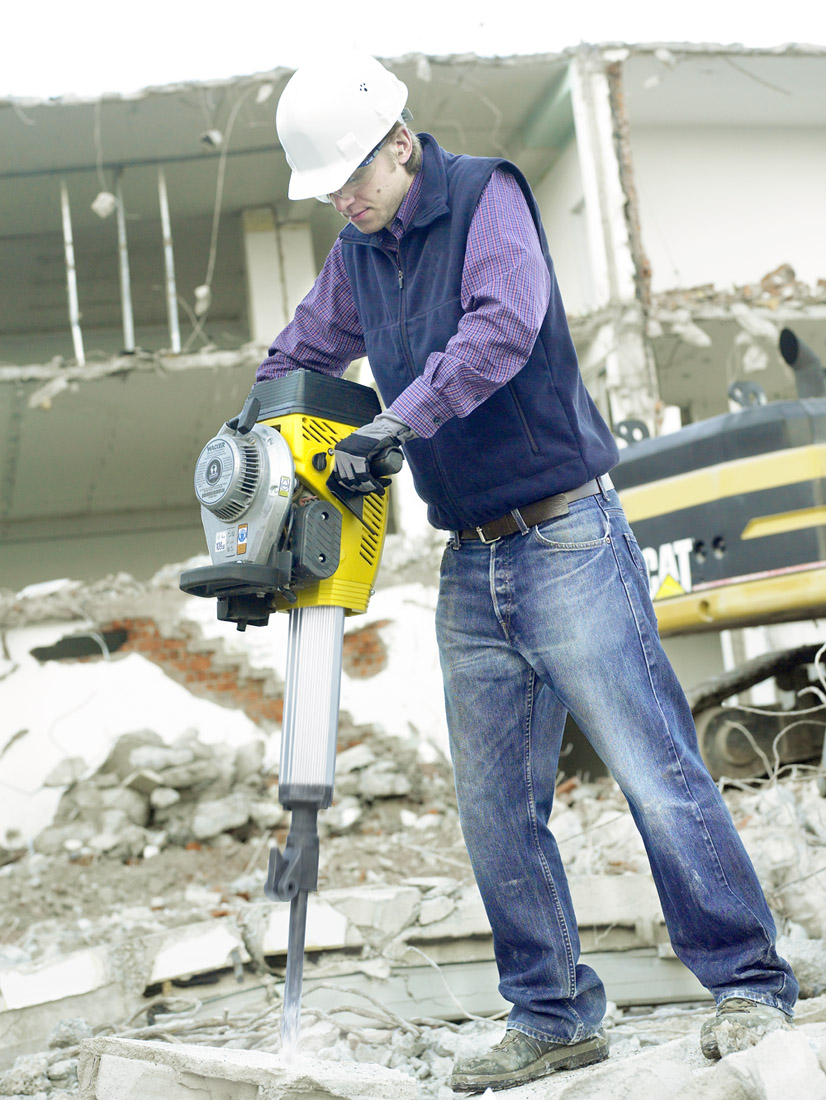
A gasoline-powered breaker on a demolition site

A full-sized portable jackhammer is impractical for use against walls and steep slopes, except by a very strong person, as the user would have to both support the weight of the tool and push the tool back against the work after each blow. A technique developed by experienced workers is a two-man team to overcome this obstacle of gravity: one operates the hammer and the second assists by holding the hammer either on his shoulders or cradled in his arms. Both use their combined weight to push the bit into the workface. This method is commonly referred to as horizontal jackhammering.

Another method is overhead jackhammering, requiring strength conditioning and endurance to hold a smaller jackhammer, called a rivet buster, over one's head. To make overhead work safer, a platform can be used. One such platform is a positioner–actuator–manipulator (PAM). This unit takes all the weight and vibration from the user.

There are two methods to controlling dust caused by the use of a jackhammer, either through using a continuous spray of water at the point of impact, or using a hood or shroud with a vacuum dust collection system.

== Types ==
=== Pneumatic ===
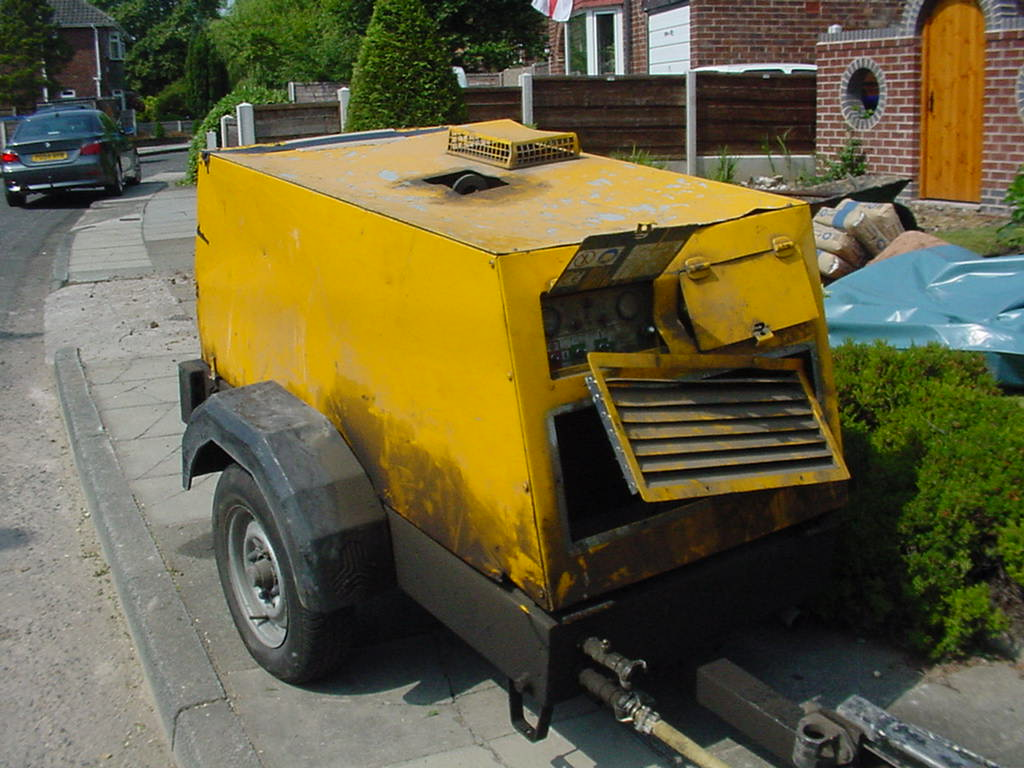
A compressor for running a pneumatic jackhammer

A pneumatic jackhammer, also known as a pneumatic drill or pneumatic hammer, is a jackhammer that uses compressed air as the power source. The air supply usually comes from a portable air compressor driven by a diesel engine. Reciprocating compressors were formerly used. The unit comprised a reciprocating compressor driven, through a centrifugal clutch, by a diesel engine. The engine's governor provided only two speeds:

- idling, when the clutch was disengaged
- maximum, when the clutch was engaged and the compressor was running

Modern versions use rotary screw compressors and have more sophisticated variable governors. The unit is usually mounted on a trailer and sometimes includes an electrical generator to supply lights or electric power tools.

Additionally, some users of pneumatic jackhammers may use a pneumatic lubricator which is placed in series with the air hose powering the air hammer. This increases the life and performance of the jackhammer.

=== Electro mechanical or electropneumatic ===
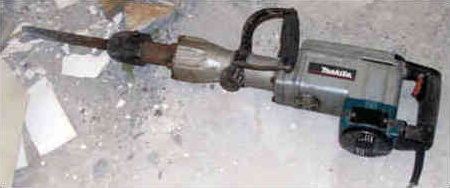
A single-phase demolition breaker

An electropneumatic hammer is often called a rotary hammer because it has an electric motor, which rotates a crank. The hammer has two pistons – a drive piston and a free-flight piston. The crank moves the drive piston back and forth in the same cylinder as the flight piston. The drive piston never touches the flight piston. Instead, the drive piston compresses air in the cylinder, which then propels the flight piston against a striker, which contacts the drill bit.

Electric powered tools come in a variety of sizes, about 12–65 lb (5.4–29.5 kg). They require an external power source but do not require a compressor. Although in the past these tools did not have the power of an air or pneumatic hammer, this is changing with newer brushless-motor tools coming close to the power of a pneumatic tool and in some cases even matching it. Electric-powered tools are useful for locations where access to a compressor is limited or impractical, such as inside a building, in a crowded construction site, or in a remote location and it is not uncommon under earth moving equipment or tool.

Electropneumatic tools use a variety of chucks for attaching chisels, but the most common are SDS-max, 7/8 in hex, TE-S, and 1+1/8 in hex. The connection end size is also related to the breaking energy of the tool. For example, the Bosch and Hilti 12 lb (5.4 kg) tools both use SDS-max, while the Bosch, Hilti, and Makita 65 lb (29 kg) tools all use 1+1/8 in hex connection. See hammer drills for more on electropneumatic hammering.

=== Hydraulic ===
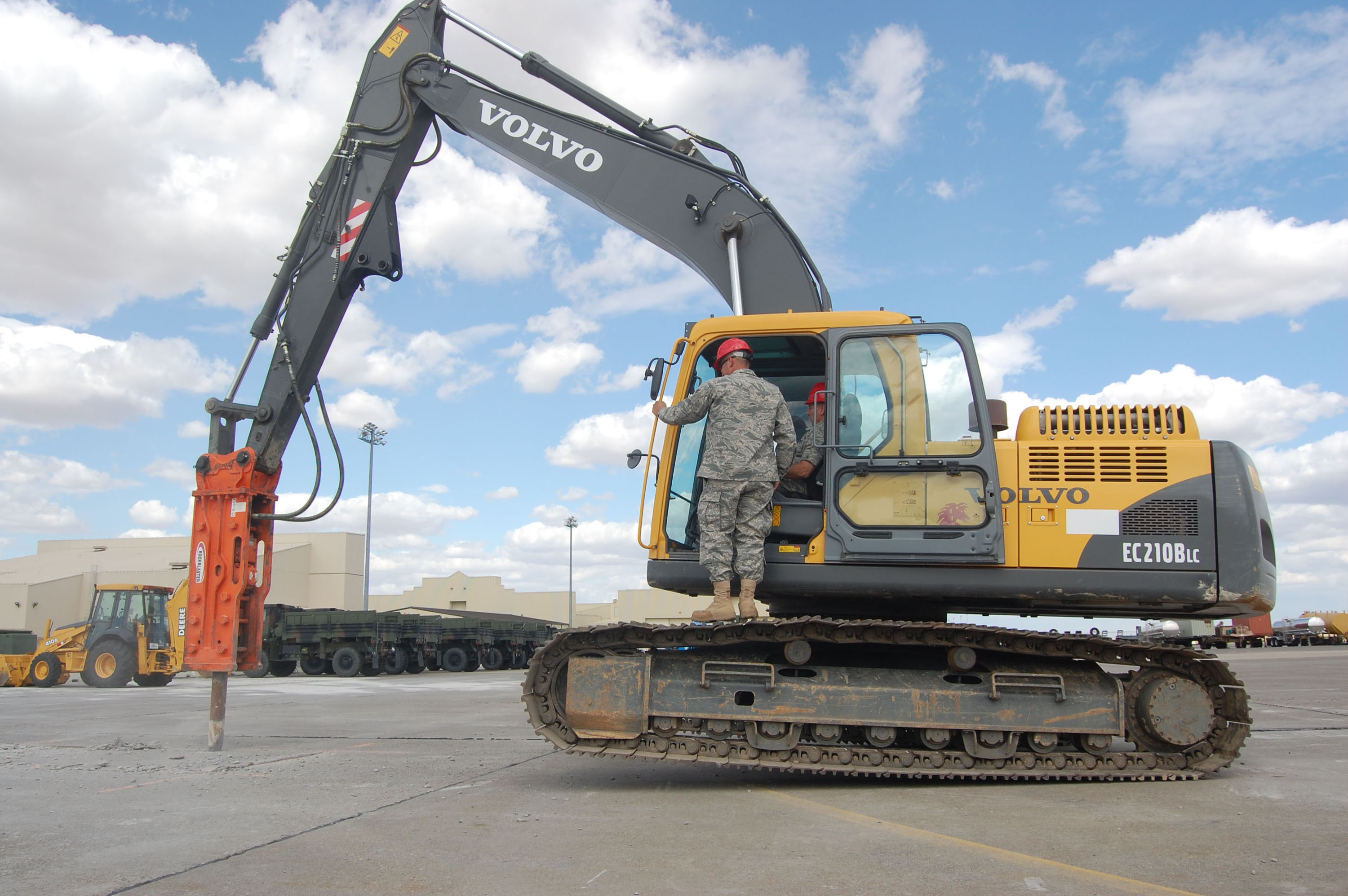
An excavator-mounted hydraulic jackhammer being used to break up concrete. Note it is adding the weight of the forward half and boom of the machine to aid the operator's effectiveness.

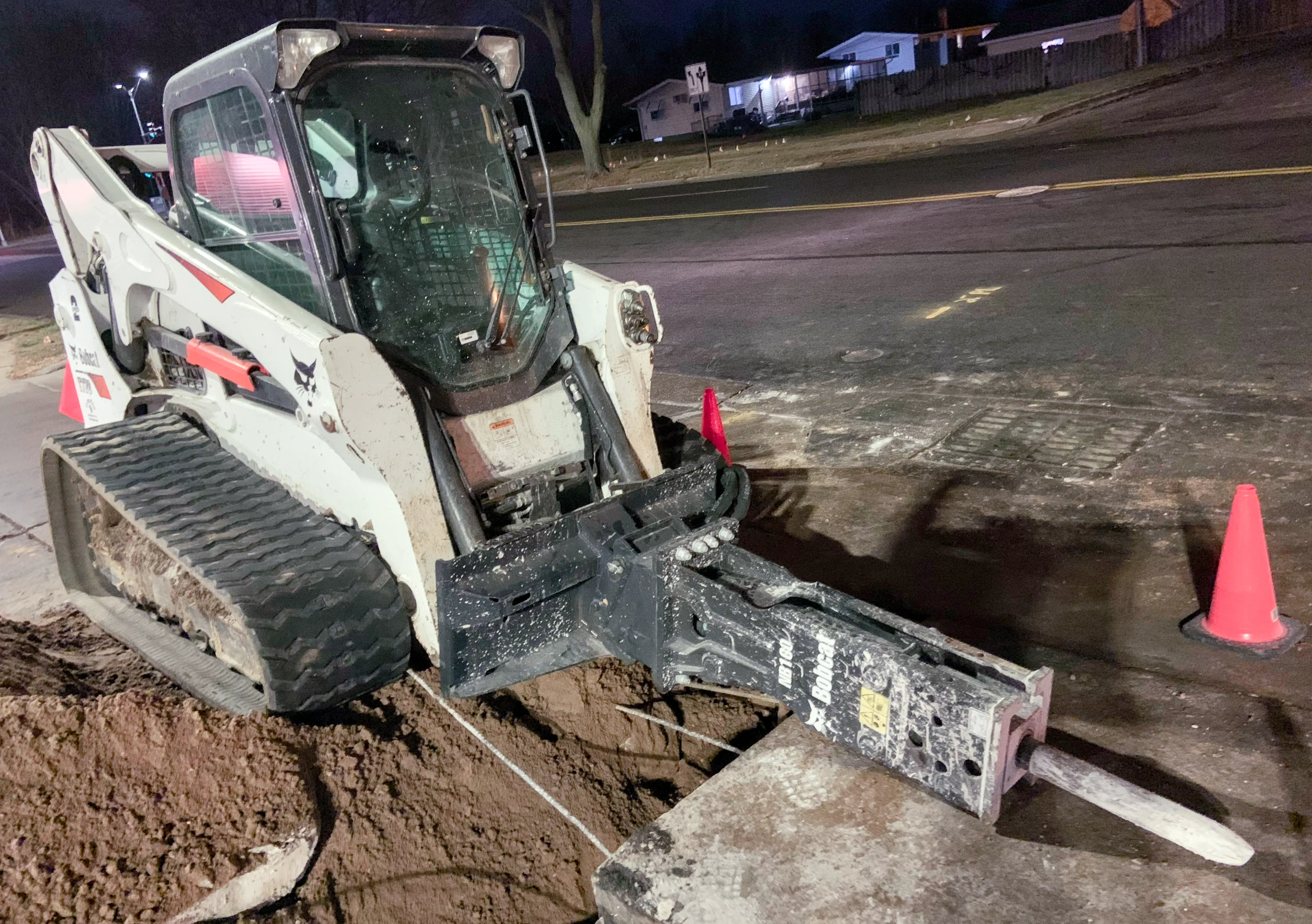
Skid-steer jackhammer

A hydraulic breaker may be fitted to heavy equipment such as an excavator or backhoe, and is widely used for roadwork, quarrying, construction sitework, and general demolition. These larger machine mounted breakers are known as rig mounted, or machine mounted breakers. Such tools can be used horizontally, as they do not require the assist of gravity to do their work. They typically use a hydraulic motor driving a sealed pneumatic hammer system, as a hydraulically activated hammer would both develop a low strike speed and potentially transfer unacceptable shock loads to the pump system. Contrast this with a steam, mechanical, or hydraulically driven pile driver.

Advances in technology have allowed for portable hydraulic breakers. The jackhammer is connected with hydraulic hoses to a portable hydraulic powerpack: either a petrol or diesel engine driving a hydraulic pump; or a mini-excavator or skid-steer via a power take-off driveshaft to the machine's hydraulic system. Hydraulic power sources are more efficient than air compressors, making the kit smaller, cheaper or more powerful than a comparable pneumatic version.

Pneumatic or hydraulic tools are particularly likely to be used in underground mines where there is an explosion risk (such as with coal), since they do not require high-voltage electricity to work, eliminating much of the danger of spark-induced detonation.

== Bits ==
Bit types include:

- Spade – provides flat finish for concrete or edging in asphalt or dirt.
- Flat tip – allows direction control or finer edge finish
- Point – general breaking
- Stake driver – drives concrete form stakes
- Scabbler – finishes surface smooth or for cleaning prior to bonding
- Flex chisel – flexible metal blade (attached to shank with bolts) for tile removal and scraping
- Bushing tool – multiple carbide points for cleaning up seams and knocking down rough spots in concrete

Sharpening: chisels may be resharpened in a shop or with an angle grinder with grinding disc. After resharpening, they must then be heat treated to restore the integrity of the steel before use. Self-sharpening polygon and flat chisels are also available.

== Health effects ==
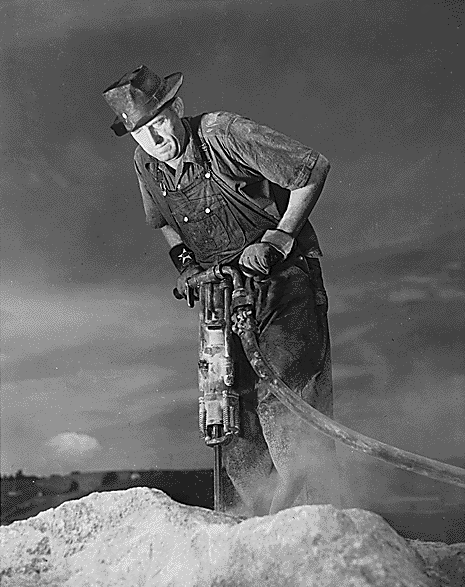
Drilling a blast hole with a jackhammer

The sound of the hammer blows, combined with the explosive air exhaust, makes pneumatic jackhammers dangerously loud, emitting more than 120 dB SPL near the operator’s ears. Sound-blocking earmuffs and earplugs must be worn by the operator to prevent a form of hearing loss, of which tinnitus is the main symptom. Although some pneumatic jackhammers now have a silencer around the barrel of the tool, loud air exhaust, hammer blows themselves, and compressor engine sounds remain unmuffled.

Use has been linked to Raynaud syndrome; in particular, prolonged exposure to the pronounced vibration conducted by the tool can lead to a secondary form of the syndrome known as vibration white finger. Applying athletic tape is not very effective in preventing white finger but seems to help alleviate some of its discomfort. Pneumatic drill usage can also lead to a predisposition for the development of carpal tunnel syndrome.

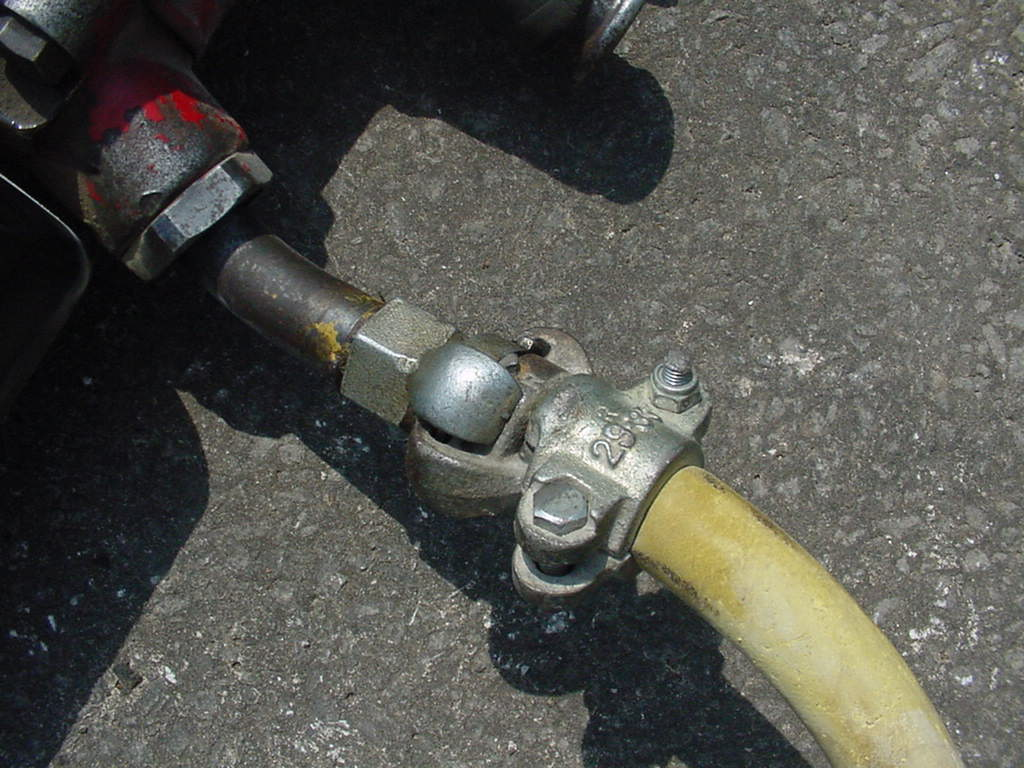
Air hose connection on pneumatic drill

Some manufacturers of electro-pneumatic tools now offer vibration reduction systems to reduce the vibration felt by the operator. For example, Hilti manufactures a jackhammer model that has approximately the same impact energy of a 60 lb (27 kg) pneumatic hammer, but the vibration felt by the operator is significantly less (7 m/s^{2}). Other manufacturers such as Makita, DeWalt and Bosch also offer electric tools with vibration dampening.

In addition, using a jackhammer to break up concrete pavement may expose the operator to hazardous dust containing respirable crystalline silica that may induce silicosis. The operator and those in the vicinity of the jackhammer operations should wear personal protective equipment, including an OSHA-approved respirator (US).
