= Pneumatic lubricator =

Tool for lubricating pneumatic systems

A pneumatic lubricator injects an aerosolized stream of oil into an air line to provide lubrication to the internal working parts of pneumatic tools, and to other devices such as actuating cylinders, valves, and motors.

Compressed air enters the inlet port and passes over a needle valve orifice attached to a pick-up tube. This tube - often equipped with a sintered bronze filter - is submerged into a reservoir bowl filled with light machine oil. Oil is pulled up by the venturi effect, and emitted as an aerosol at the outlet port. The needle valve is typically situated within a clear polycarbonate or nylon housing to aid in oil flow rate adjustment. Some compressor oils and external chemicals can cause polycarbonate and/or nylon sight glass to be degraded and create a safety hazard

A lubricator should always be the last element in an FRL (Filter-Regulator-Lubricator) unit. If an FRL is connected "backwards" with incoming air connected to the lubricator, oil-laden air interferes with pressure regulator operation, oil is separated from the air stream and drained by the filter, and very little or none is delivered to connected equipment.
