= Simon Fairman =

Simon Fairman (c. 1792–1857) of West Stafford, Connecticut, is credited as having invented the scroll-type lathe chuck in 1830; his son-in-law, Austin F. Cushman invented the self-centering Cushman Universal Chuck. He was issued a patent for his design by the US Patent Office on July 18, 1840.

== See also ==
- Austin F. Cushman
