= Austin F. Cushman =

American inventor (1830–1914)

Austin F. Cushman (June 18, 1830, in Belchertown, Massachusetts – November 29, 1914, in Hartford, Connecticut) was an American inventor who invented the self-centering Cushman universal chuck in 1862; his father-in-law, Simon Fairman, had previously invented the lathe chuck.

== See also ==
- Simon Fairman
