= Samuel Loomis (businessman) =

American furniture maker

Samuel Loomis (1748–1814) was a Connecticut furniture maker and the most celebrated maker of Colchester/Norwich style furniture.
