= Drill bit shank =

End of a tool bit grasped by the chuck of the driving component of the tool

The shank is the end of a drill bit grasped by the chuck of a drill. The cutting edges of the drill bit contact the workpiece, and are connected via the shaft with the shank, which fits into the chuck. In many cases a general-purpose arrangement is used, such as a bit with cylindrical shaft and shank in a three-jaw chuck which grips a cylindrical shank tightly. Different shank and chuck combination can deliver improved performance, such as allowing higher torque, greater centering accuracy, or moving the bit independently of the chuck, with a hammer action.

== Brace shank ==
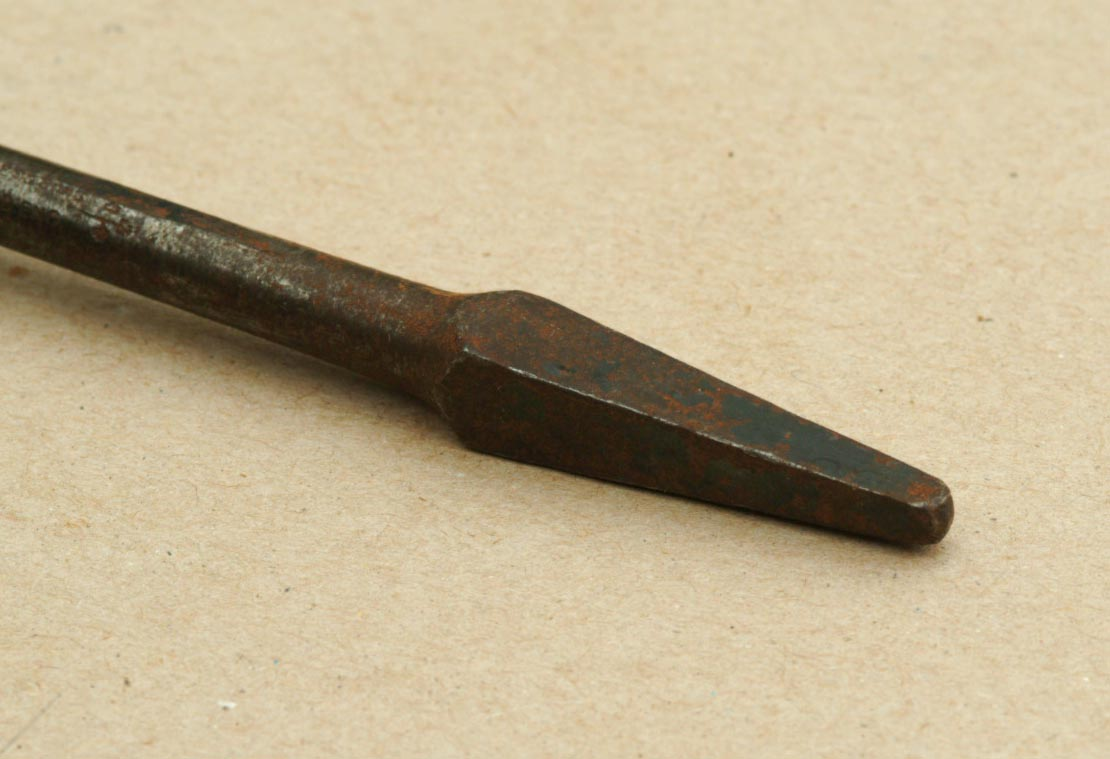
Brace drill bit shank

This shank was common before 1850, and is still in production. At first, the tapered shank was just rammed into a square hole in the end of the drill. Over time, various chuck designs have been invented, and modern chucks can grasp and drive this shank effectively.

== Straight shank ==
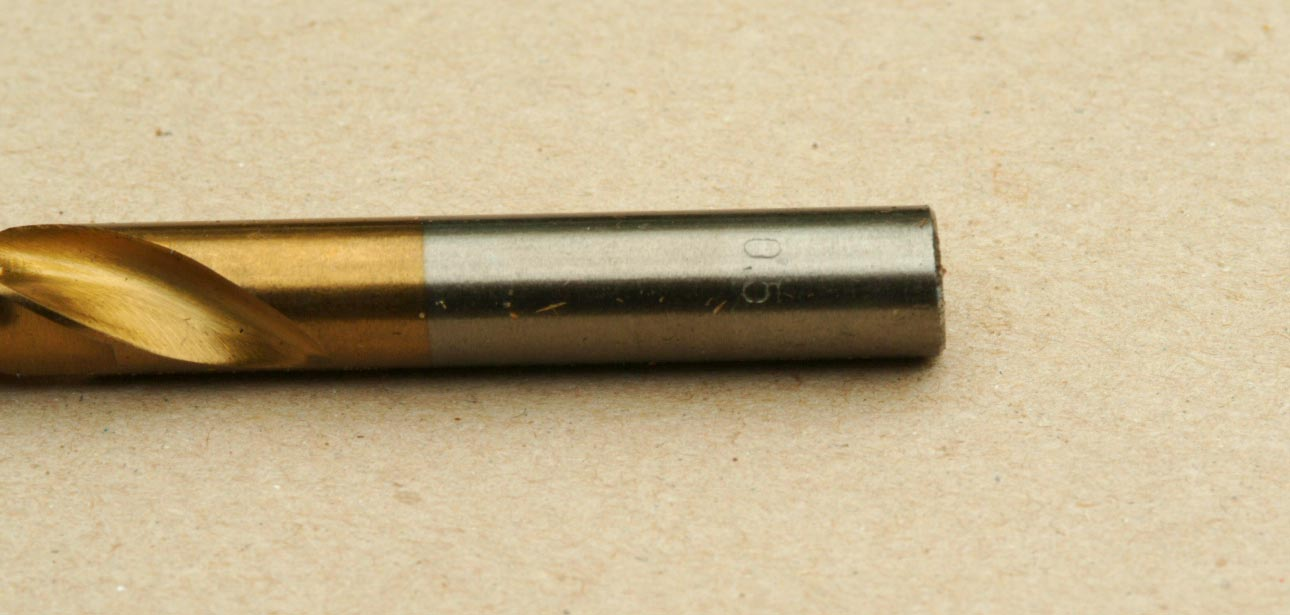
Straight drill bit shank

The straight shank is the most usual style on modern drill bits, by number manufactured. The whole of the drill bit, shaft and shank, is usually of the same diameter. It is held usually in a three-jaw drill chuck. Bits of diameter too small to grip firmly can have straight shanks of larger diameter than the drill, which can be held firmly in a standard size collet or chuck. Large drill bits can have straight shanks narrower than the drill diameter so that they can be fitted in chucks not able to chuck the full diameter. Such a drill bit is called a reduced-shank or blacksmith's drill. For example, this allows a 1/2-inch (13 mm) bit to be used in a pistol-grip drill's 3/8-inch (9.5 mm) chuck. One particular type of reduced-shank drill bits are Silver & Deming (S&D) bits, whose sets run from 9/16-inch (14 mm) to 1 1/2-inch (38 mm) drill body diameter with a standard 1/2-inch (13 mm) reduced shank for all. This allows drill presses with 1/2-inch (13 mm) chucks to run the larger drills. S&D bits are 6 inches (150 mm) long with a 3-inch (76 mm) flute length. The name comes from a company in Salem, Ohio that broke up into other companies circa 1890; bits of this design were popularized by that company.

== Hex shank ==
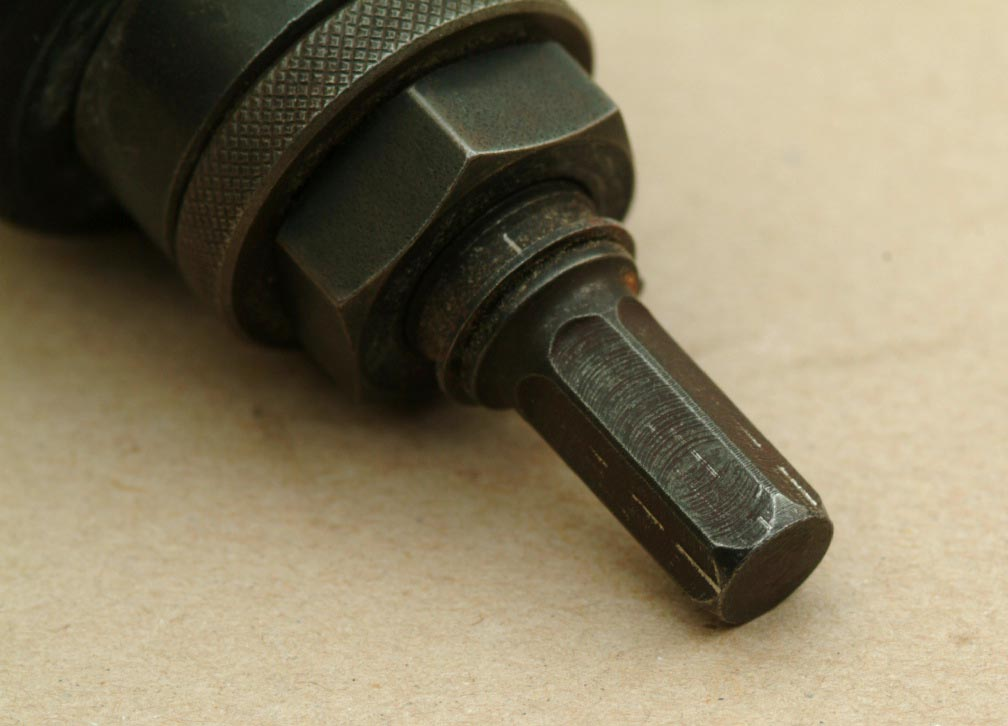
Hex drill bit shank

The flats of a hex shank can either be machined on a round shank, as in the photograph, or be the natural flats of hex bar stock. A hex shank can be grasped by a 3-jaw drill chuck or held in a chuck specifically for hex shanks. Quarter-inch hex shanks are common for machine screwdriver bits and have spread from that application to be used for drill bits that are compatible with screwdriver machinery.

== SDS shank ==
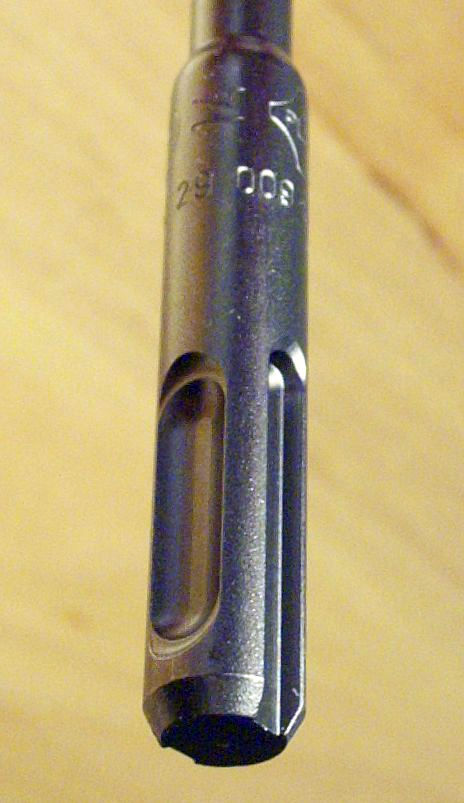
SDS-plus drill bit shanks

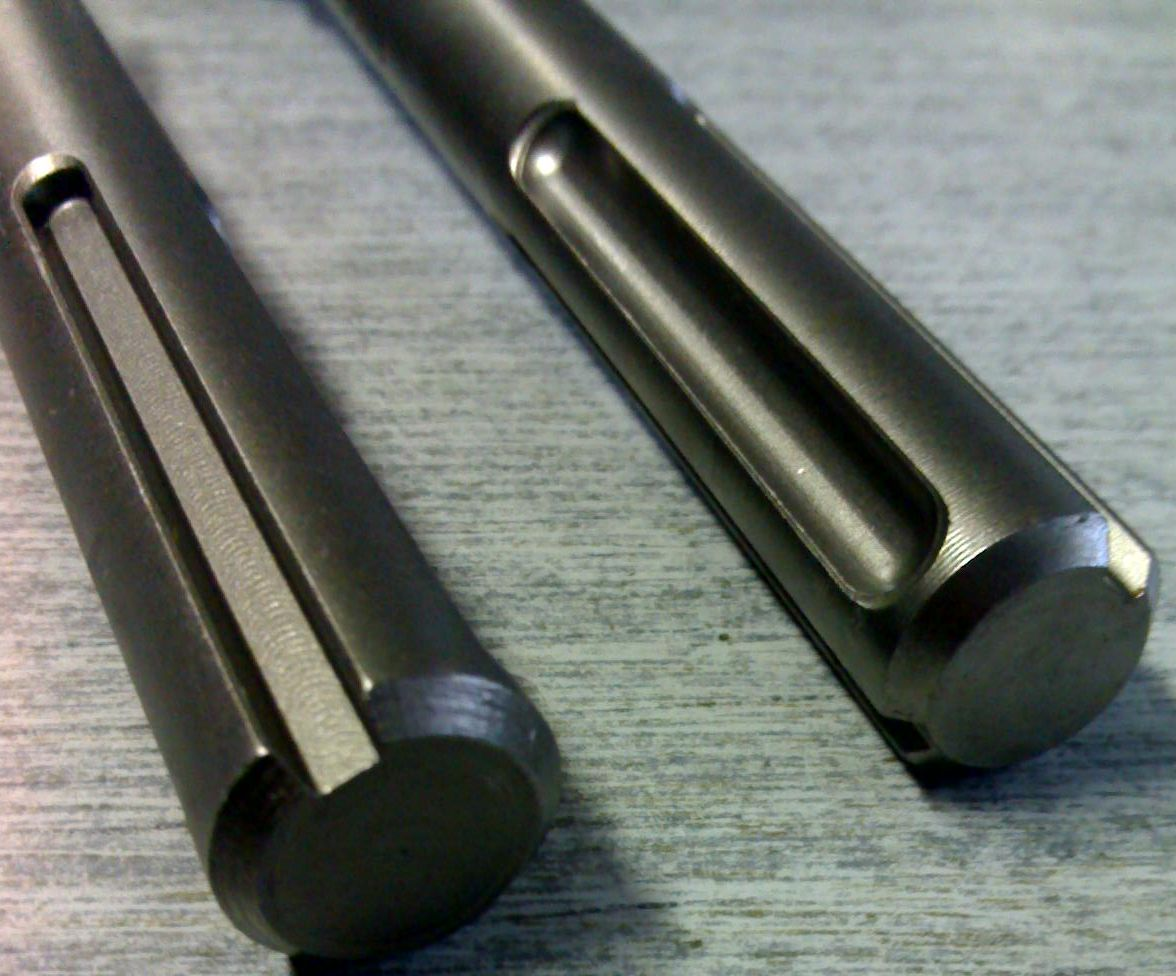
SDS-max drill bit shanks

The SDS system is a standardized method for attaching drill bits and chisels to rotary hammers used for masonry and concrete work. The SDS shank fits into a spring-loaded chuck without tightening. The bit can move slightly back and forth in the chuck, allowing efficient hammer impact transfer. Its non-circular cross-section prevents slipping during rotation. The hammer mechanism strikes only the bit, not the heavier chuck, which improves drilling efficiency.

The chuck keys engage the shank slots to transfer rotation and hold the bit securely. The hammer strikes the flat end of the shank.

Four standardized SDS sizes are used:

- SDS-Quick – for small drills and light-duty applications
- SDS-plus – the most common; 5/32–1 3/16 in (4–30 mm) drills, 4 5/16 in – 4 ft 11 1/16 in (110–1,500 mm) lengths.
- SDS-Top – 9/16 in (14 mm) shank, now obsolete.
- SDS-max – for large rotary hammers; 1/2–1 3/4 in (12–45 mm) drills, 11 13/16 in – 1 ft 8 7/8 in (300–530 mm) lengths.

Hilti’s TE-S system is similar but designed for chiselling only in larger demolition tools.

The SDS system was developed by Bosch in 1975, based on the TE system introduced by Hilti in 1960. Later Hilti TE designs became compatible with SDS systems. The name SDS comes from the German phrase Steck – Dreh – Sitzt! ("Insert – Turn – Seated!"). Bosch uses “Special Direct System” internationally, and alternate interpretations exist in German-language sources.

SDS-plus

SDS-Top

SDS-max

TE-S

== Triangle shank ==
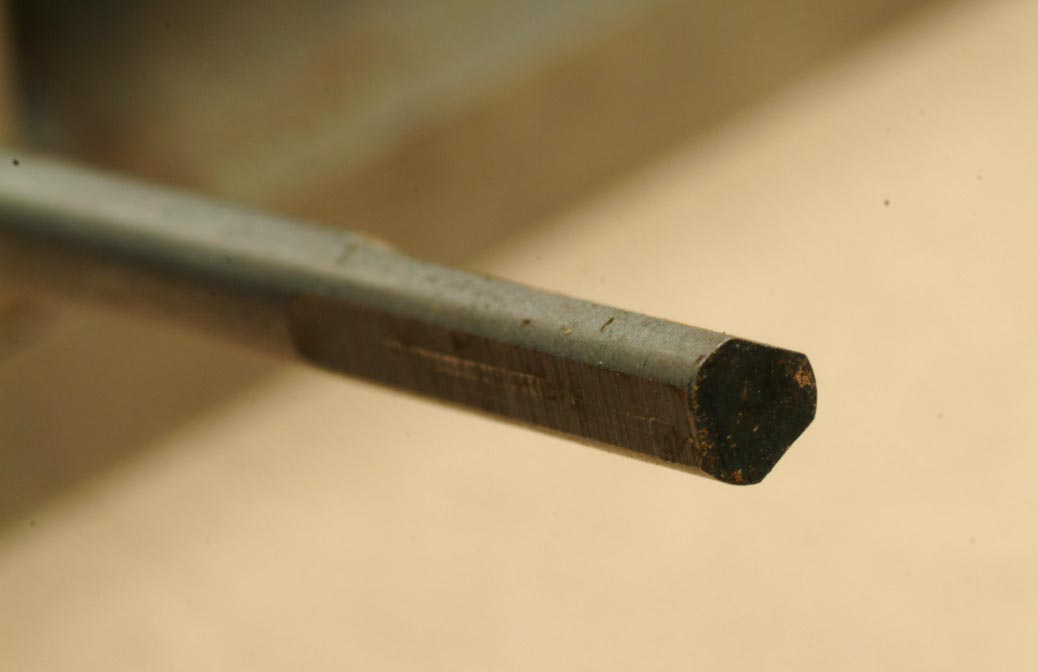
Triangle drill bit shank

The triangle shank is almost always made by machining three flats on round bar stock. It is intended as a minor modification of a straight shank, still allowing it to be held in a 3-jaw drill chuck, but allowing higher torque transmission and limited slipping.

== Morse taper shank ==
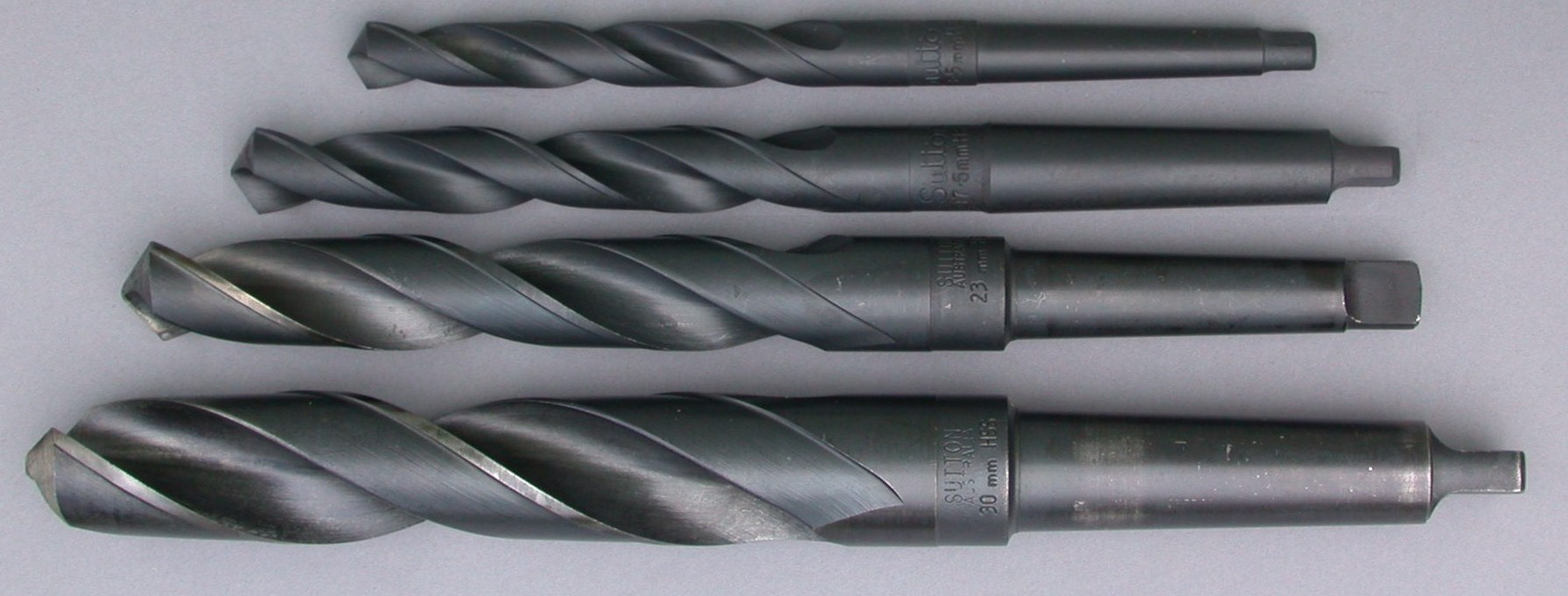
Morse taper drills, from 17/32 in (13.5 mm) (with the No. 1 Morse taper shank) through to a 1 3/16 in (30 mm) drill (No. 4 morse taper shank)

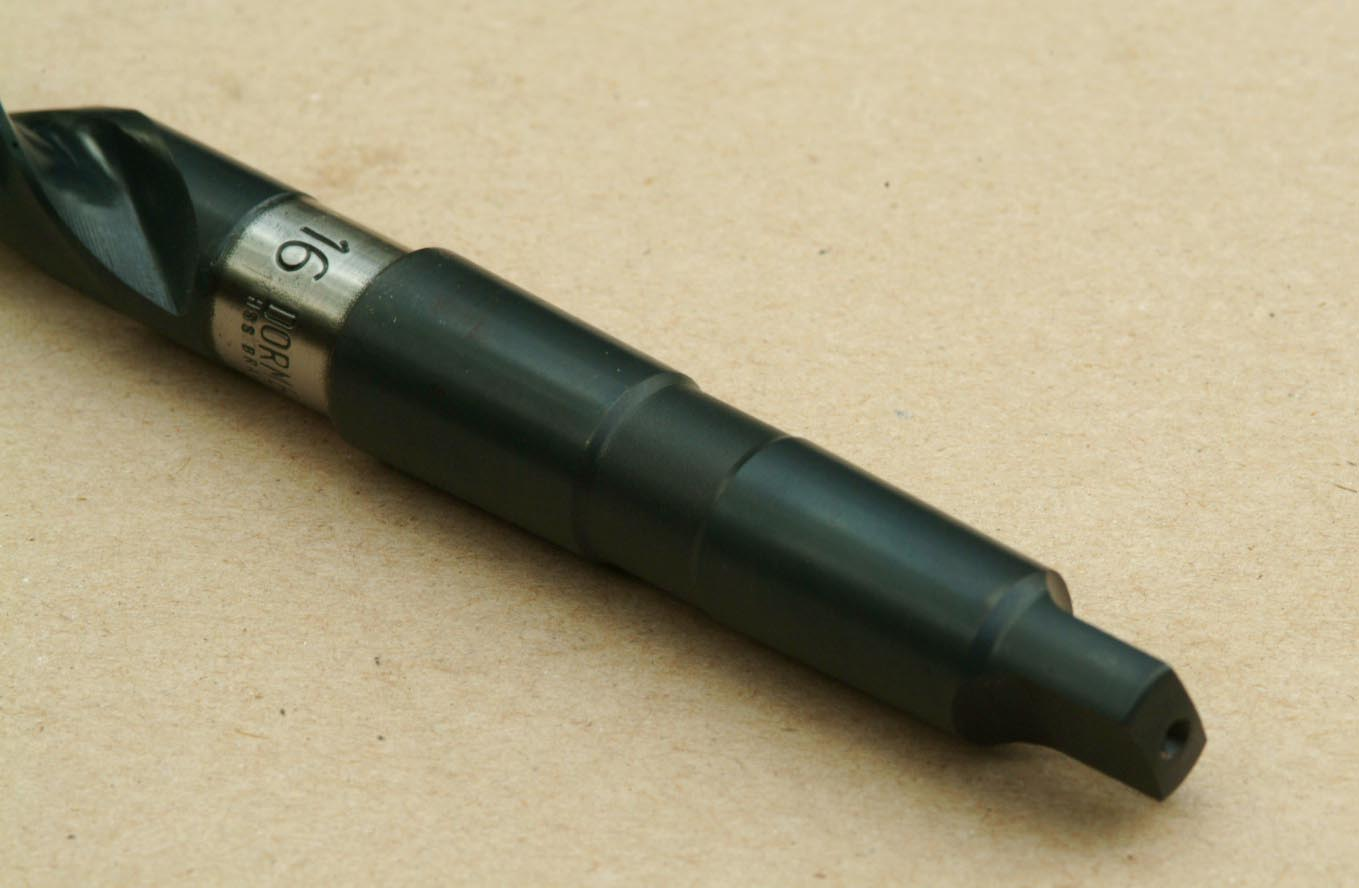
Morse Taper Drill Bit Shank

The Morse taper twist drill bits pictured right are used in metalworking. The full range of tapers is from 0 to 7.

The Morse taper allows the bit to be mounted directly into the spindle of a drill, lathe tailstock, or (with the use of adapters) into the spindle of milling machines. It is a self-locking (or self holding) taper of approximately 5/8 in/ft (52 mm/m). This allows the torque to be transferred to the drill bit by the friction between the taper shank and the socket. The tang at the end of the taper provides a positive drive of the drill when the taper fails to grip. Tools without a tang can still eject these bits from the taper.

The arbor of a drill chuck is often a Morse taper and this allows the chuck assembly to be removed and directly replaced with the shank of a Morse taper drill bit. A range of sleeves may be used to bring the size of the smaller Morse tapers up to the size of the drive spindle's larger taper. Sockets are also available to extend the effective length of the drill as well as offering a variety of taper combinations.

The detail image shows a Morse taper shank on a 5/8 in (16 mm) diameter drill bit.

== Square shank ==
Square taper drills were also used for large ratchet drills, for drilling large holes, or in thick plate. These bits would fit straight into a ratchet drill, and the ratchet drill would be used against a strong arm, for pressure to push the drill into the work piece.

== Threaded shank ==
Some drills, wire wheels, etc. use a threaded shank. One example is cylindrical wire wheels meant to be pushed into a pipe of some sort to clean the inside of the pipe, but some ordinary, but mostly rather large, wood drills have threaded shanks as well.

Small (about 1/4 in or 6.35 mm diameter) threaded drill bits and countersinks are common in aircraft metal work. Threaded drill bits may be held in drills meant to reach into very tight spaces, and threaded countersink cutters are widely used (along with finely adjustable depth stops) to create holes which put a matching rivet directly flush with the surface.
