= Groudle Glen Railway rolling stock =

Sea Lion and polar bear at Lhen Coan

This is a general list of rolling stock and locomotives currently or formerly on the Groudle Glen Railway on the Isle of Man.

== Locomotives ==
=== Steam ===
- Sea Lion built by W. G. Bagnall (1896) works no. 1484. Built for the opening of the railway. In service on the preserved railway.
- Polar Bear built by W. G. Bagnall (1905) works no. 1781. The railway's second locomotive. Preserved in 1967 at the Brockham Railway Museum, and now in service at the Amberley Museum Railway.
- Brown Bear (constructed 2019) a new-build locomotive project started in 2013. Replica of Polar Bear (1905). Construction was completed in July 2019 at Old Hall Farm, Cumbria and shipped to the railway the same month. It came into service in July 2019.
- Jack built by Andrew Barclay & Sons Co. (1925) bought privately (1994) and sold privately (1997).
- Annie built in 1998 by Richard Booth to a design of W. G. Bagnall. A replica of a locomotive supplied to the Gentle Annie Tramway in New Zealand in 1911. Privately owned,
- Otter built by North Bay Railway Engineering Services (2018) works no. 6. New-build locomotive to Bagnall's "Sipat" design. It is painted in a distinctive lined light blue livery.

=== Diesel ===
- Dolphin built by Hunslet Engine Company for Robert Hudson Ltd (1952) works no. 4352. Purchased in 1983. In service.
- Walrus built by Hunslet Engine Company for Robert Hudson Ltd (1952) works no. 4353. Purchased in 1983. In service.
- Parracombe steam outline built by Baguley in 1947, works no. 3232, arrived on the railway in 2007. Privately owned. In service.

=== Battery ===
- Sea Lion built by British Electric Vehicles in 1921, works no. 313 modified to include bogies and battery truck. Scrapped in 1922.
- Polar Bear built by British Electric Vehicles in 1921, works no. 314, suspected to have been involved in a serious derailment in the early 1920s and didn't re-enter service. Scrapped in 1926.
- Polar Bear (Replica) replica of the 1921 battery locomotives. Built by Alan Keef in 2003 on original chassis, in service.

== Rolling stock ==
=== Four wheeled coaches ===
All of the railway's coaches were supplied by G.F. Milnes & Co. of Birkenhead and were of similar design. They resemble a smaller version of the trailers used on the Manx Electric Railway and were originally either varnished or painted a dark colour (contemporary postcards make it difficult to tell which) but the restored versions are varnished and carry no lining out, which is evident from early views. The four GGR carriages at Amberley Museum carry a brown and cream livery.

- "A" Coaches, the three original four-wheeled "toastrack" coaches supplied with "Sea Lion" in 1896 were never originally numbered but are known as the "A" coaches: they feature stone guards at rail level and a more plain valence design when compared to other coaches.
- "B" Coach was ordered owing to popularity of the line in the early years. This coach was slightly different from the others, having higher windows, different style valences, and is always known by its letter owing to these small differences: it remains to be re-built but several parts are in store.
- "C" Coaches & "D" Coaches, un-numbered originally made up the final four coaches (2x "C" and 2x "D") and arrived with Polar Bear in 1905; referred to as "C" and "D" type, the only major difference being the small style change of the valancing.

There are two restored coaches with "Polar Bear" at Amberley Museum and two further replicas (one of which serves as a disabled car), and four rebuilt coaches at Groudle itself, built by the company. A further original rebuilt coach is at the West Lancashire Railway, but made a return to Groudle in 1996.

=== Bogie coaches ===
The first two coach bodies are built on the frames of coaches originally purchased from Doddington in 1982, the original bodies being unfit for future use and considerably different from the more traditional version now applied. The coaches all feature a valance along their lengths using the same pattern as the original 1905 type coaches to give them a more authentic appearance. The coaches are numbered one to three but their fleet numbers aren't immediately apparent as they are only painted on one end on the underframe.

- No. 1, built (1986), roof added in 1988.
- No. 2, built (1987) by the railway with roof,.
- No. 3, built (1994) to be all-weather car but project remained incomplete.

The third coach, used at peak times, is slightly different from the original two, owing to the proposed all-weather appearance which hasn't been executed. All the coaches are painted in a maroon livery, the original two carrying G.G.R. lettering until repaint in 2001 when this was lost; however in 2007 all three coaches were fitted with the new railway crest; interiors are black painted bench seating with black (changed from grey in early 2008) floors, featuring a hand-brake at one end of the vehicle.

All three coaches are due to be replaced in 2014 by new build coaches of similar design funded by the Manx Lottery Trust. The underframe of bogie coach 3 will be retained as a works flat.

=== Fauld wagons ===
In 1982, the railway purchased a set of "bomb" wagons which had previously been used at RAF Fauld. They provided limited passenger accommodation before the arrival of the bogie coaches and since then time have been used on works trains. They fell out of use and their condition deteriorated. They were all scrapped by 2011.

- No. 1, drop-side ballast wagon, scrapped in 2011.
- No. 2, tool van, with drop-sides removed, scrapped in 2011.
- No. 3, storage van, later stripped to flat, scrapped in 2011.
- No. 4, used as coal wagon for storage only, scrapped in 2011.
- No. 5, never used in service, used as coal store without brakes, scrapped in 2011.
- No. 6, bought but never arrived on railway, used for spare parts and scrapped in 1984

The wheelsets and many of the brake components from the Fauld wagons were retained by the railway for future use. In 2012 two wheelsets were incorporated into the flat wagon nicknamed "FAT 1".

=== Other stock ===
- "Flat Wagon" Runner constructed from the frames of three four-wheel runners, with removable sides added 2007 for the purposes of carrying ballast and other materials; in use but to date does not carry fleet number
- Four-Wheel Flats retrieved from local saw mill upon closure, one extant but in dismantled form, three used to make bogie runner above, none of these remain in service in their original form.
- Tool Van, arrived in 2004 from Lochaber Narrow Gauge Railway painted in winter red livery and stored in purpose-built shed in summer months. Sold in 2011.
- Works Van, built in 2011 by Midcam Engineering of Barnsley. A bogie mounted vehicle which features an open wagon and covered accommodation area for use by permanent way crews.
- FAT 1, built in 2012 on site, a four-wheeled flat wagon which incorporates two wheel-sets from the scrapped Fauld Wagons. Is currently being used as a base for the construction of Brown Bear.
- Tipper Wagon built by Allens of Tipton and only used for storage of locomotive ash in latter times, remains extant on site (was numbered No. 7 but lost numbering during re-paint in 2008 and is now lettered "Loco Dept.") not rail connected to the line at Lhen Coan station.
