= Gentle Annie =

Gentle Annie may refer to:

- "Gentle Annie" (song), an 1856 American song composed by Stephen Foster
- "Gentle Annie" (Tommy Makem song), a song by Tommy Makem
- Gentle Annie (film), a 1944 American film
- Gentle Annie, a 1942 novel by MacKinlay Kantor; basis for the film
- "Gentle Annie", a Celtic mythological figure with similarities to the Irish goddess Anu
- Cenchrus longispinus or Gentle Annie, a species of grass
- Gentle Annie Summit, an elevation near Tiniroto, New Zealand
- Gentle Annie Tramway, a narrow gauge railway near Gisborne, New Zealand

== People ==
- Francis Joseph Bayldon (1872–1948), Australian master mariner and nautical instructor
- Anna Etheridge (1839–1913), Union nurse during the American Civil War
- Alfred Jefferis Turner (1861–1947), Australian pediatrician and entomologist
