= Drill stand =

Perpendicular feed device for handheld drills

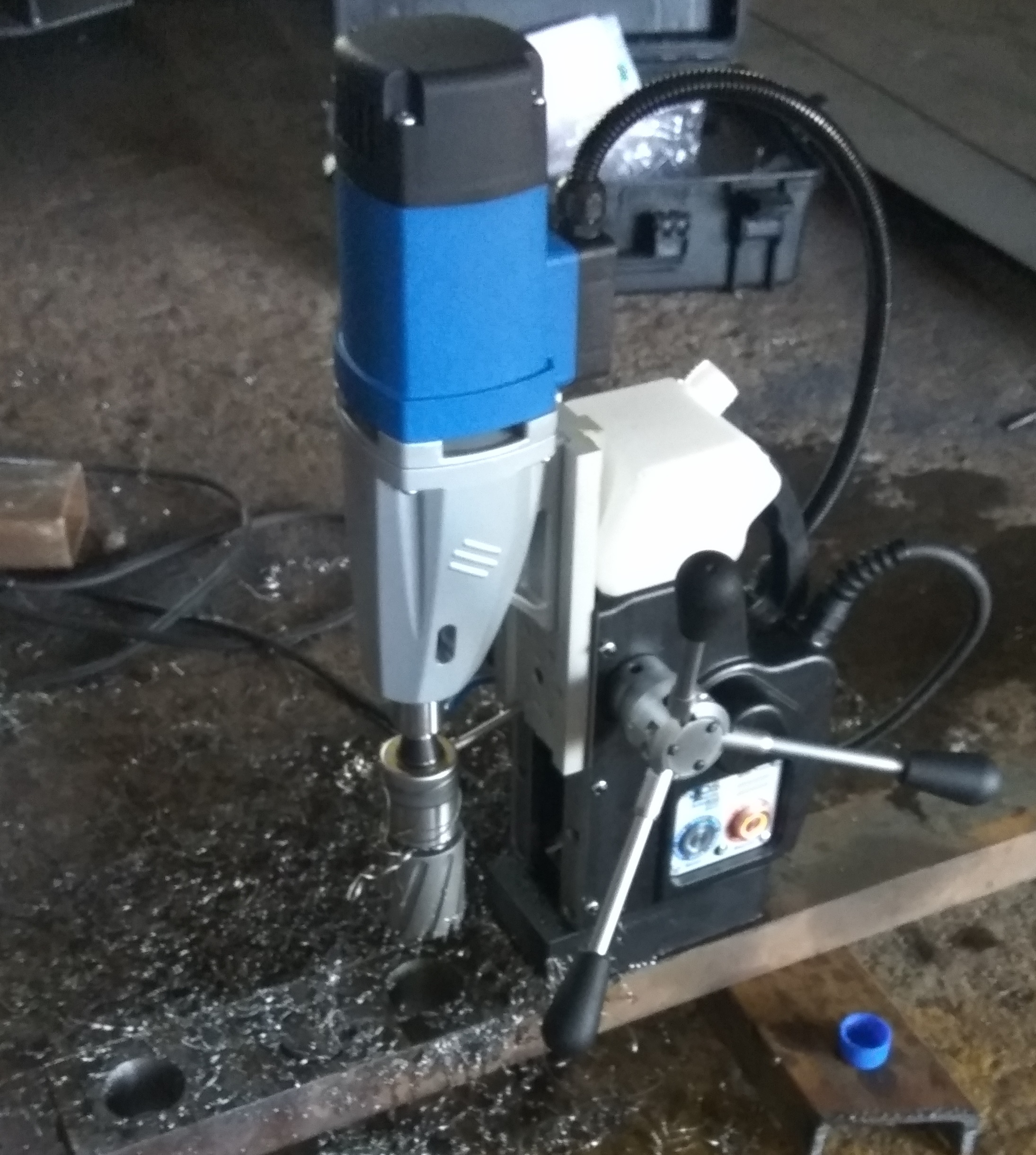
Drill stand with magnetic table mount and handwheel for manual feeding

A drill stand, or portable drill guide, is a device to which a handheld drill can be mounted to control how the drill bit is fed into the workpiece. They allow handheld drills to be used in a manner similar to a simple benchtop drill press or magnetic drilling machine. Their purpose is the same as a drill press, namely to make it easier to drill holes perpendicular to a surface. They are often lightweight and mobile. Some drill stands have adjustable angles. They range from simple hobbyist versions with a lot of play to professional industrial versions with a magnetic base for drilling in steel. Some can be screwed or clamped to the workpiece.

== Mounting ==
Traditionally, many drill stands have had a 43 mm Euro clamp for attaching the drill. This mounting pattern fits most corded handheld drills.

However, the Euro clamp fits very few modern cordless drills. To get around this problem, there are some drill stands with an integrated chuck and shaft that again can be connected to the chuck of the cordless drill.

== Features ==
- The desired drilling angle can be maintained more easily and with increased repeatability
- The workpiece can be clamped by hand or clamped to the drilling guide with clamping devices
- Drill stop allows for precise depth when drilling blind holes
- Efficiency can be further increased by combining with T-slotclamps or other accessories such as a coordinate table
- The feed lever provides leverage that can reduce the hand strength required to feed the drill into the workpiece

== See also ==
- Tool
