= Drill press =

Drilling machine

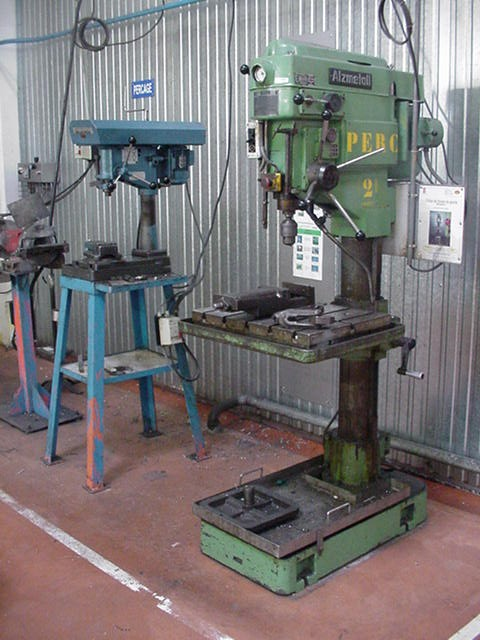
Benchtop drill press (left) and floor-standing drill press (right)

A drill press is a drilling machine suitable for quick and easy drilling of straight holes, countersinking, or counterboring that are perpendicular to both directions of a table surface. In comparison, it is more difficult and less repeatable to drill perpendicularly with a hand-held drill.

Two common variants are the benchtop drill press for mounting to a workbench and the larger floor-standing drill press for mounting to the floor, and they should preferably be securely mounted to prevent them from tipping over. A special variant is the magnetic drilling machine, which is a mobile drilling machine intended to be magnetically clamped during use, and is used to some extent for field repairs and production in industry.

Drill presses can be divided into three main types depending on their construction:

- Double drill press is a new variant of drill press in which the spindle is on the X and Y axis. the bench top can do a full 360 rotation.
- Column drill press is a common type characterized by the fact that the drill spindle can be moved up and down axially ("along a column"), and has a height-adjustable table, usually adjustable via a rack and pinion. They often used with a vise holding the workpiece, and the vice is again clamped to the table. The vice has to be moved in order to drill several holes.
- Radial drill press is a special variant where the spindle also is attached to a slide so that the drill can also be moved radially between each drilling. This makes it possible to drill several holes without moving the workpiece. Some radial drilling machines also have the option of rotating the spindle around the radial axis in order to drill at an angle.

Drill presses are available from small sizes for hobby workshops to heavy-duty versions for industrial use. They can be operated manually with a handle to raise or lower the drill, and/or can be computer numerically controlled (CNC).

Often they have an adjustable depth stop and the ability to lock the handle at a given height. Most have adjustable speeds, and different speeds should be used for different materials and drill types, for example from 100-3600 r/min. Small drill diameters require higher speeds, and soft materials require higher speeds.

== Safety ==
Bench and floor-standing drills are powerful and dangerous machines, and work accidents can be relatively common. Getting stuck in the machine can result in lost fingers or arms. Therefore it is recommended to not wear gloves, clothes with long sleeves or have long hair hanging while working.

They are also usually top-heavy machines, and should ideally be mounted securely to the floor or a table to prevent the machine from tipping over.

Workpieces should always be clamped securely (especially metal workpieces), otherwise they may get stuck in the drill bit and become projectiles that can injure people. For example, a clamp or vise can be used to hold the workpiece, and the clamp or vise itself can be attached to grooves in the drilling table.

Before use, the operator should check that they have the right personal protective equipment (safety glasses and hearing protection), test that the emergency stop and safety shield (a barrier that protects the operator from flying debris) work, verify secure clamping of the tool and workpiece, and adjust the speed according to the bit and material being drilled into.

== Compared to milling machines ==
Drill presses have chucks like other drills, and are not suitable for milling. The spindle is not designed for lateral forces, and milling operations can therefore cause the chuck to loosen and pose a danger to the user or cause premature and unnatural wear on the bearings.

Still, it is not uncommon for hobbyists to convert drill presses into makeshift milling machines for hobby use. This requires extensive modifications and gives a mediocre milling machine that may be suitable for hobby projects in soft materials such as aluminium, brass and wood, but will generally be ill-suited for work in steel.

For milling it is therefore preferable to use a suitable milling cutter, for example a router for woodworking or milling machine for metal. A milling machine, on the other hand, can be used for both drilling and milling, but is a much more expensive tool.

== See also ==
- Drill
- Milling (machining)
- Coordinate table
- Drill stand, perpendicular feed device for hand-held drilling machine
