= Dolphin and Walrus (locomotives) =

Coordinates: 54°10′39″N 4°25′19″W

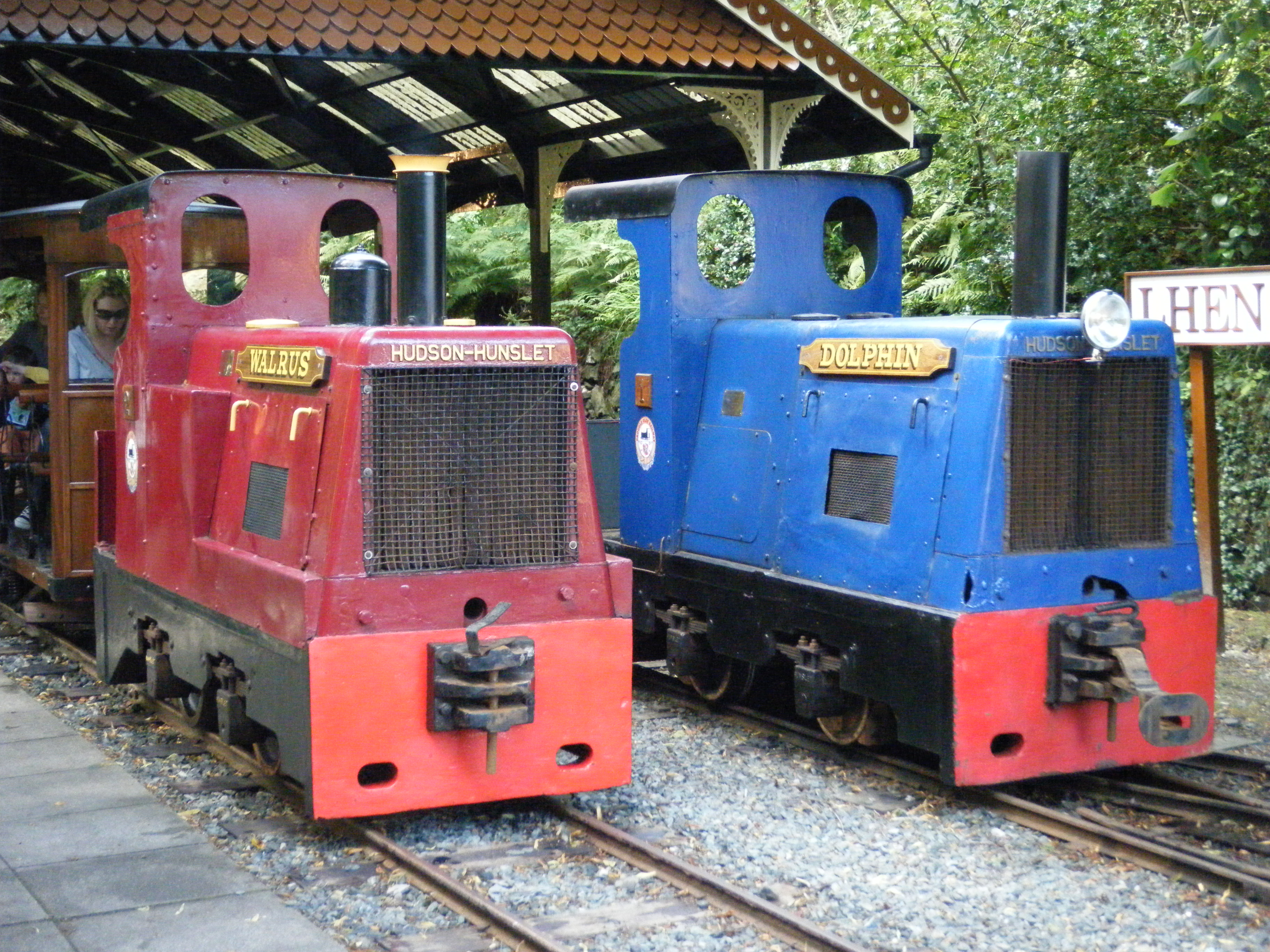
- Walrus (in red) and Dolphin (in blue), on the Groudle Glen Railway in August 2009
Type and origin
- Power type: Diesel
- Builder: Hunslet Engine Company
- Serial number: 4353 (Walrus) and 4384 (Dolphin)
- Build date: 1952
Specifications
- Configuration
  - AAR: 0-4-0DM
  - UIC: B
- Gauge: 2 ft (610 mm)
- Prime mover: Gardner
- Engine type: Diesel
- Transmission: Mechanical
Performance figures
- Maximum speed: 8 mph (13 km/h)
Career
- Operators: Groudle Glen Railway

Dolphin and Walrus are diesel locomotives that are operated on the Groudle Glen Railway.

== Early career ==
Three similar locomotives were in 1952 by the Hunslet Engine Company for Robert Hudson (explaining the unusual manufacturers' title which appears prominently, cast into the locomotive's radiator frontage). They were built to run in a sand and gravel pit in Twickenham and did so until closure, after which the three were put up for sale.

This pair were purchased by Doddington Park in Chipping Sodbury where a pleasure ground had been established. It was at this time that the locomotives acquired a "steam outline" structure. This consisted of a sheet metal half-cab with oval windows, false dome and chimney. The exhaust from the engine which had previously been directed beneath the frames was re-routed to be shot from this new chimney to give the appearance that the engine was "steaming" along. Walrus was given the name the "Doddington Dragon" at this time and heraldic crests added to the side panels. By 1980 the park was suffering losses and was closed, the locomotives, carriages and all trackwork were put up for sale.

== To Groudle Glen ==
When restoration of the Groudle Glen Railway began in 1982 the locomotives were purchased from the park together with all the rails, sleepers and associated pointwork, arriving on the Isle of Man shortly thereafter. In line with previous naming policy (the original locomotives had been named Sea Lion and Polar Bear as these animals were features of the zoo in the glen) the volunteers of the Isle of Man Steam Railway Supporters' Association named Dolphin (fleet number "1") and Walrus (fleet number "2"). This was the first time fleet numbers had been given to locomotives on the railway. Both locomotives were given a green livery and wooden nameplates, and until the return of Sea Lion in 1987, provided all the motive power for the line's public operations and permanent way trains. The locomotives are retained today and perform shunting duties and winter works train duties regularly.

== Livery and maintenance ==
Walrus is identifiable from her sister as she retains her false dome (actually half a gas cylinder welded to the cladding), and sports dummy side tanks; other than these visible features she is largely identical to Dolphin in all but livery. Dolphin is fitted with headlights, unlike her shedmate. In 2012 to mark the locomotives' 60th anniversary, they received new brass nameplates to replace the 1980s wooden nameplates which have subsequently been mounted for display in the Sea Lion Rocks Visitor Centre and the Lhen Coan Engine Shed.

=== Dolphin ===
Having carried the lighter green livery since arrival in 1983, it was in 1992 that she was re-painted into a darker brunswick green shade, then again in 1998 she received an unusual all-over grey livery (including buffers, side frames, cab interior, etc.) but this was short-lived and by the summer of 2001 a further full repaint saw the locomotive outshopped in a royal blue livery. All maintenance is carried out on site and the engine receives annual attention, alternating with Walrus each year. Although now largely relegated to works duties, it does appear in service occasionally as part of gala events each summer, and occasionally for the Santa Trains. It was this locomotive that was renamed Rudolph each yuletide between 1984 and 1997 at which time new nameplates denoting Blitzen were installed. These have, since 2003, been carried by Walrus instead. In 2012 she was stripped down and fully repainted back into her 1980's green livery to mark the 30th Anniversary of the railway's restoration by volunteers, in this guise she hauled public trains on the Special 30th Anniversary day in May.

=== Walrus ===
Having carried the lighter green livery since arrival in 1983, the locomotive was withdrawn in 1989 and the wheels removed for reprofiling and major engine work. Being surplus to requirements it was several years before this work was carried out and the locomotive lay on blocks in the back of the carriage shed at Lhen Coan for many years. When the line had visiting locomotives in 1998 as part of the Steam 125 event, "Walrus" needed to be stored in the open to accommodate the visitors so the wheels were replaced at this time, and a coat of battleship grey paint applied to smarten her up. War Department transfers were also applied to the false tanks at this time. By 2003 interest had resurfaced (the 50th anniversary of the two the previous year having sparked interest), and over the winter the locomotive was overhauled and repainted into a maroon colour scheme with yellow features. It now operates on gala days and performs works train duties, shared with No.1 "Dolphin". Since returning to service she has been selected for standby duties on Santa Train days, and is renamed annually as "Blitzen" for the occasion.
