= Rail drilling machine =

A Rail Drilling Machine is a type of portable drilling machine specialized for drilling holes in rails. Rail Drilling Machines are also popularly called as Rail Drills, Portable Rail Drill, Rail Core Drilling Machines, etc.

== Purpose ==
The rail drilling machines are used for drilling holes needed for among others:

- Joining two rails (but nowadays rails are usually welded instead)
- Signaling
- Inserting cables in tracks
- Providing earthing to tracks
- Connecting sensors

== Types of Rail Drilling Machine ==
Generally, there are three types of rail drilling machines depending on their drive.

=== Electric Driven Rail Drilling Machine ===
The Electric Driven Rail Drilling Machine runs on electricity. The machine needs an electric power supply either 230 volts or 110 Volts. This rail drill machines are equipped with power electric DC motor with brushes. The Electric Driven Rail Drilling Machines are ideal machines to use on railway workshops. When using Electric Driven Rail Drilling Machine in a remote location it can also be connected to generators or gen sets.

=== Petrol Engine Driven Rail Drilling Machine ===
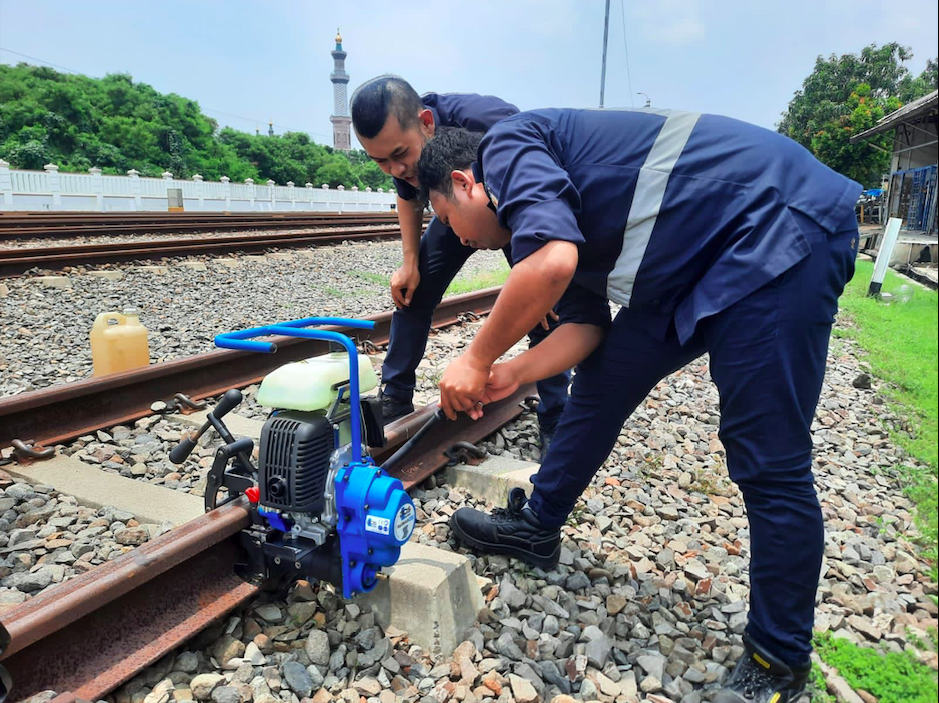
Petrol Driven Rail Drilling Machine

The Petrol Engine Driven Rail Drilling Machine or most commonly known as Petrol Rail Drilling Machine runs on Benzin (petrol). This machine is equipped with a petrol engine generally of 1500 Watt (2 HP). The Petrol Rail Drilling Machines are ideal machines when drilling in a remote location where there is no availability of electricity.

=== Cordless Battery Driven Rail Drilling Machine ===
The Cordless Battery Driven Rail Drilling Machine or most commonly known as Cordless Raill Drilling Machine run on electricity supplied from a Li-ion battery. This is the newly developed type of rail drilling machines. This rail drill machines are equipped with power electric DC motor with brushes. This is an ideal machine to make holes in rail tracks at a remote location. The machines can do limited holes as the power of the machine depends on the capacity of the battery.

== Magnetic Drilling Machines for Rail Drilling ==
A Magnetic Drilling Machines or Magnetic Drill Press is also commonly used for drilling rails. Some compact low height magnetic drilling machines are ideal to clamp inside the profile of rail track and make holes. These machines are suitable for use inside railway workshop.

A heavy duty magnetic drilling machine can also be used for drilling railway tracks in a workshop considering the size of the magnet fits in the profile of rail track. In this case, the railway track has to be placed in sleeping position.

== Rail Cutters ==
Mainly two types of cutters or cutting tools are used for rail drilling with the drilling machine.

=== Rail Annular Cutters ===
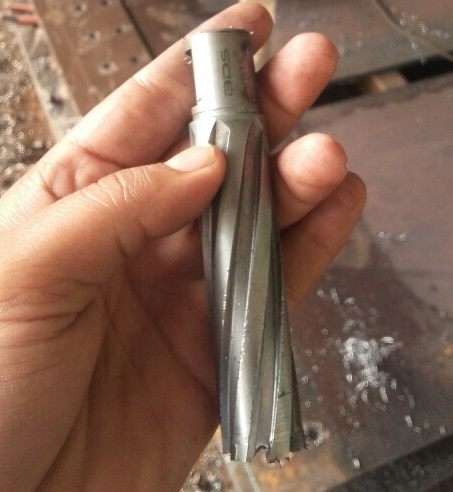
Rail Core Drill or Rail Annular Cutters with Tungsten Carbide Tip. Available in 30 mm or 55 mm cutting lengths depending on the manufacturer.

The Rail Annular Cutters or Rail Core Drills are one of the types of Annular Cutters. These rail core drills are made from Tungsten Carbide Tip. The rail core drills are very strong and can drill hard and corroded material. The rail core drills due its geometry are available only above 12 mm diameter.

=== Rail Twist Drills ===
The Rail Twist Drill or Rail Drill Bits are the types of Spiral Drill Bits. These drill bits are ideal for making smaller diameter holes which are not possible with TCT Annular Cutters. These drill bits can make holes as low as 2 mm diameter. Mostly 6 to 8 mm diameter holes required for earthing cables or attaching sensors to rail tracks are made by twist drill bits.

== Machine for Keyslot (Oval) Holes in Tracks ==
There are some applications where oval holes or key slots as to be made in the rail track. For such application, a portable milling machine with cross table base is used. Such machines can make a key slot with the help end mill cutting tools. There are very few manufacturers which produce such types of machines. The demand for such machines increases as it delivers portability.
