= Annie (locomotive) =

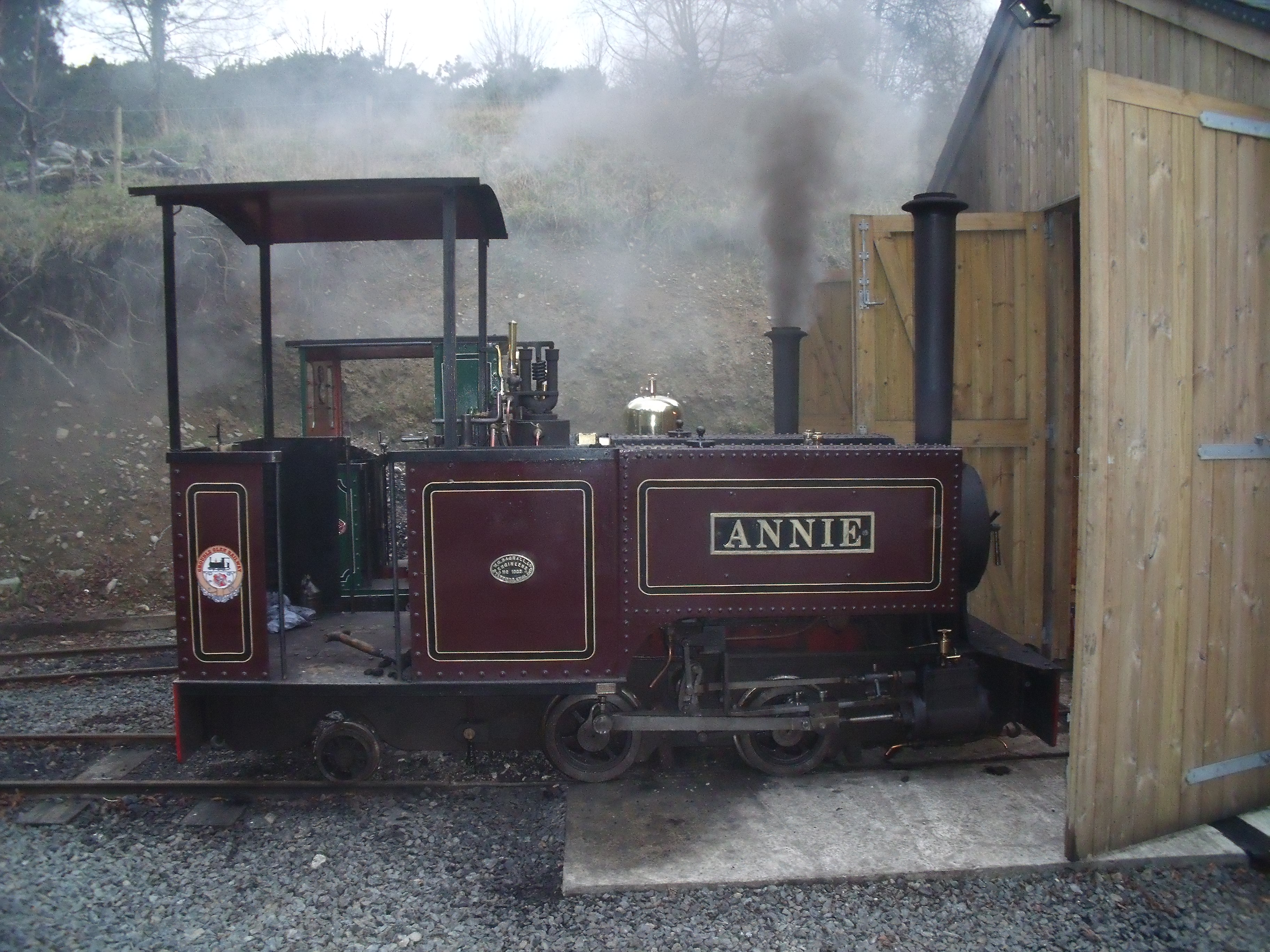
Type and origin
- Power type: Steam
- Designer: W. G. Bagnall
- Builder: Richard Booth
- Serial number: 1922
- Build date: 1998
Specifications
- Configuration
  - Whyte: 0-4-2ST
- Gauge: 2 ft (610 mm)
- Boiler pressure: 250 psi (1.72 MPa)
- Cylinders: Two
- Loco brake: Hand
- Train brakes: Hand
Performance figures
- Maximum speed: 15 mph (24 km/h)
Career
- Operators: Groudle Glen Railway
- Disposition: Groudle Glen Railway

Annie is a steam locomotive that operates on the Groudle Glen Railway on the Isle of Man.

== Design ==
The replica Annie was built by Richard Booth to the design of a Bagnall class 'E' 0-4-2ST locomotive named Annie which was built in 1911 and shipped to New Zealand to operate the Gentle Annie Tramway near Gisborne. The original Annie later ended up at a quarry at Motuhora along with another Bagnall engine from the Gentle Annie Tramway, and was buried on the site by a landslide in the late-1950s/early 1960s. Dug up in the late 1970s, the remains of Annie passed through several owners, and are now owned by the East Coast Museum of Technology at Makaraka near Gisborne, who have prepared what remains of the engine for static display.

The replica Annie was constructed based upon working drawings; mechanically identical to Polar Bear but with a 0-4-2 wheel arrangement. The cylinder mould was obtained from the Bennett Brook Railway in Australia, where another replica Annie had been built. The two replicas are both 2 ft (610 mm) gauge whereas the original Annie was built to run on 2 ft 6 in (762 mm) gauge tracks.

== Construction ==
The locomotive was built locally and at the time of construction was the island's newest steam locomotive, having been completed in 1998 and officially launched as part of the Steam 125 event that year. Since this time two new steam locomotives have been provided for the Laxey Mines Railway making them the newest locomotives on the island, although the volunteers at Groudle Glen Railway are currently in the process of building Brown Bear, a replica of the railway's 1905 locomotive Polar Bear which they aim to have in service by 2018.

== Components ==
The locomotive has carried a number of steam whistles/hooters since entering service, with as many as three carried at any one time. Despite having been "built from scratch", the locomotive can claim some original components - the water tank lid on one of the side tanks is in fact an original one from Sea Lion, new ones having been fabricated as part of her 1987 rebuild.

== Livery ==
The locomotive carries a deep tuscan red livery, the same as that carried by Manx Northern Railway locomotive Caledonia upon her return to service in 1995, with the notable difference that Annie carried a black/yellow lining out scheme whereas Caledonia carries a more intricate vermilion lining with gold leaf detailing.

== Service ==
Together with Sea Lion she provides the main traction on the Groudle Glen Railway and can be seen in service at summer weekends on the line as well as some evenings in peak season and various out of season special services, notably the popular annual Santa Trains. She has been out of service since Easter 2013 for a rebuild which includes new cylinders, works to her side tanks and a new livery. She's expected back in regular service during the 2014 summer season.

== See also ==
- Isle of Man Steam Railway Supporters' Association
- British narrow gauge railways
