= Magnetic drilling machine =

Portable drilling machine with a magnetic base

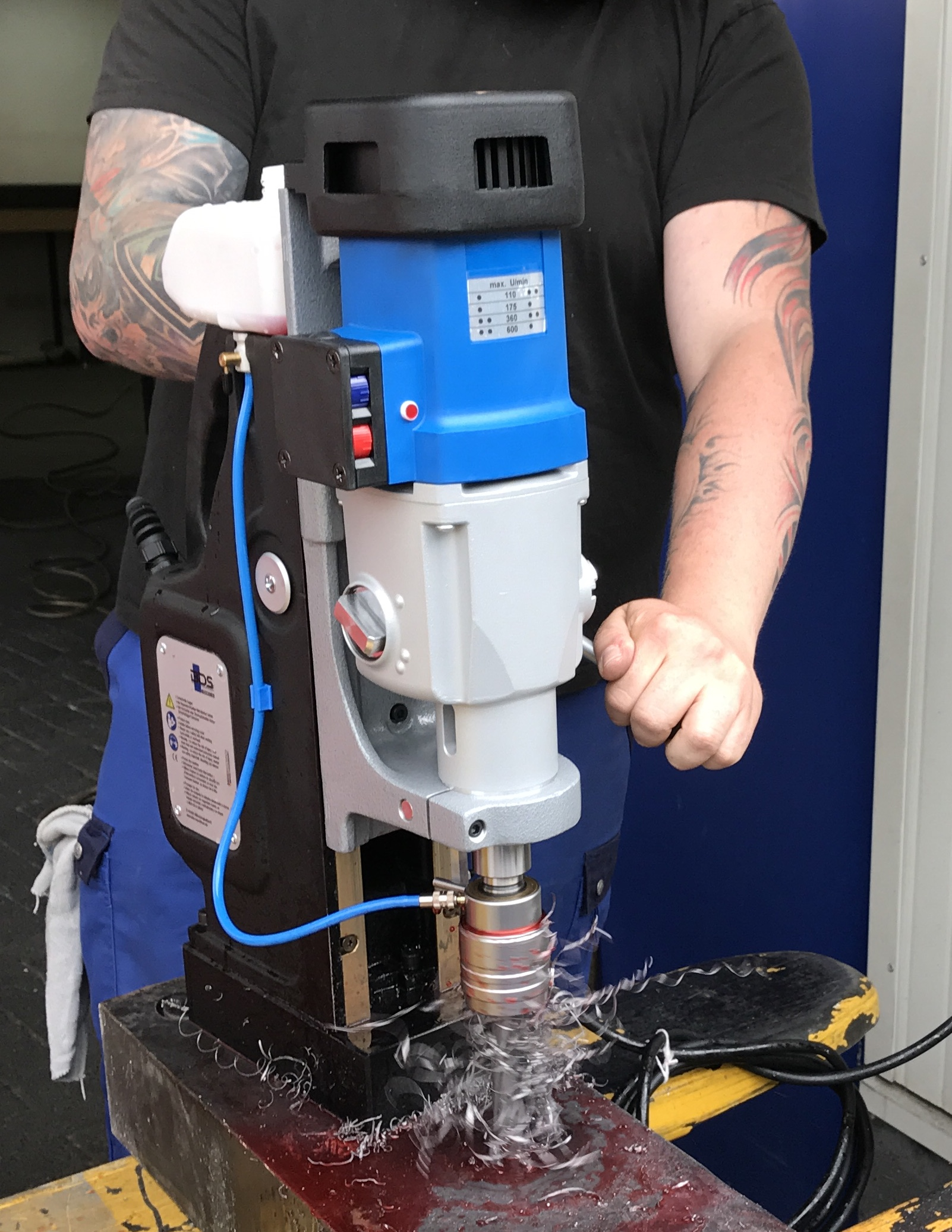
A magnetic drilling machine used for drilling perpendicular on a 100 mm thick workpiece of mild steel

A magnetic drilling machine is a portable drilling machine with a magnetic base (either electromagnetic or permanent magnet). It can use twist drill bits, annular cutters, milling cutters, and other rotary cutters. With suitable bits it can also tap threads, ream, and countersink. Its combination of a stable magnetic base and low RPM help resist or reduce torque forces created by large diameter bits. Magnetic drilling machines with reversible motor and variable speed controls can also perform operations like tapping, countersink and reaming. A magnetic drilling machine with a cross table base can also perform light milling.

== Description ==
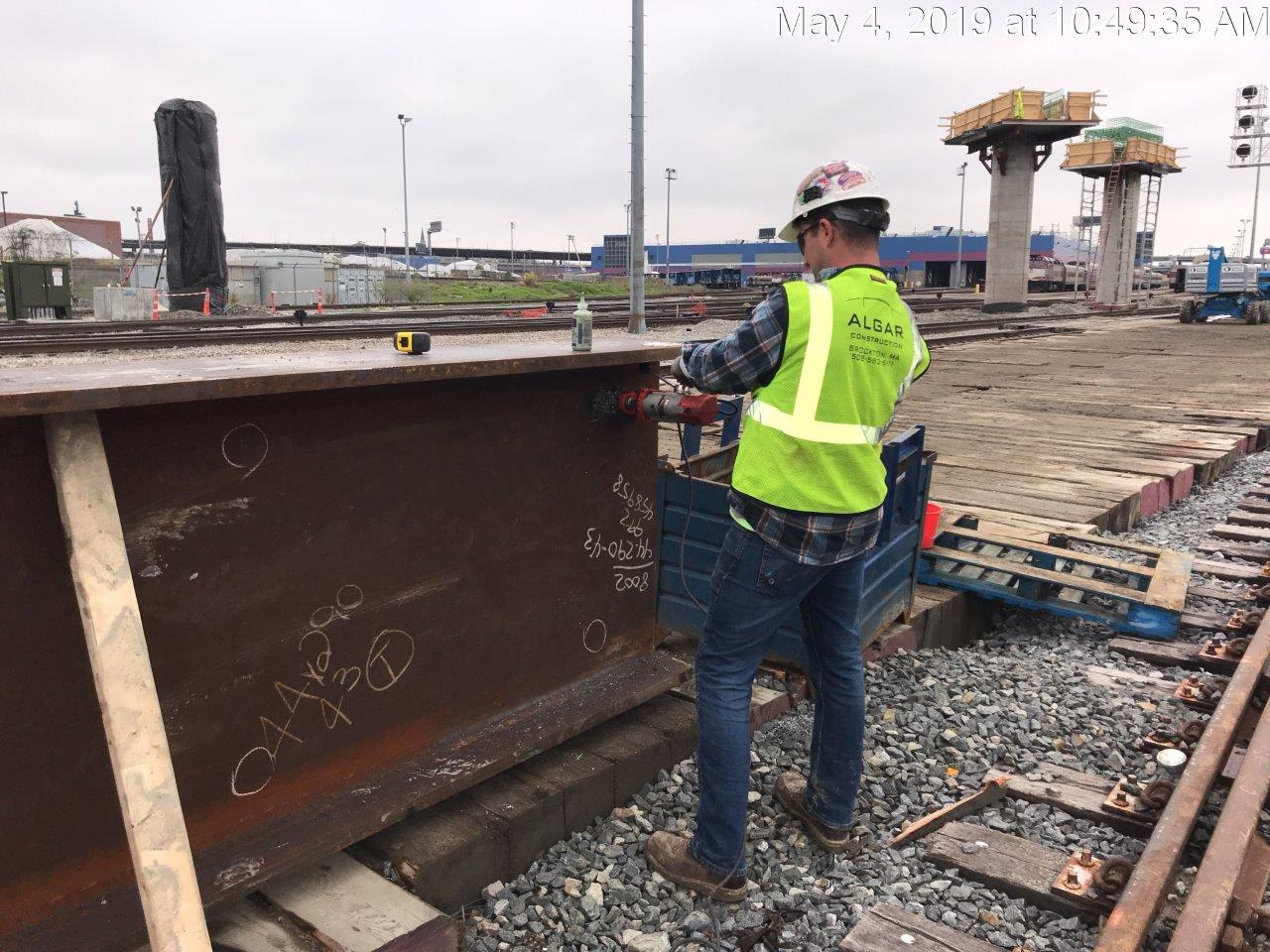
An ironworker using a portable magnetic drill on a steel I-beam

A portable magnetic drilling machine is faster and more portable alternative to hole making machines such as the drill press, and is more accurate than a hand drill.

A portable magnetic drilling machine is used on steel or other magnetic materials. It gives an accuracy of 0.01 mm to 0.05mm in steel or other magnetic material. The drill bits used for this machines are generally made from high-speed steel(HSS) or are tungsten carbide tipped(TCT).

=== Base ===
The base of a magnetic drill is equipped with a powerful electromagnet to easily clamp the machine on the work piece to be drilled. When energized this magnet is held on the metal work piece locking the machine base to the surface. The electromagnet plays a very important role in a portable magnetic drill, as it helps the machine to be steady, does not let the machine dismount during drilling, can work with the machine overhead, horizontal or vertical. Its very important that persons with heart pacemakers or other medical implants must not use this magnetic drilling machine. Generally, a magnetic core drilling machine is used on a ferrous material directly, but it can also be used on non-ferrous material like aluminum with the help of clamping devices. The new generation magnetic drilling machines' bases are also equipped with Swivel Base, to position the machine under magnetic condition.

=== Stand ===
A drill stand is the main body of the magnetic drill where the electric switches for motor and magnet are mounted, magnet indicator is mounted and also the clock-anticlockwise direction switches are mounted. The body of the magnetic drill holds together the motor and the magnet base. The feed handle is also attached to the body. The body of the magnetic drill helps the motor slide on it to get an upward and downward feed. The body of the magnetic drill also plays the role of a handle to lift and move the machine from one place to other. The material used for the body is generally cast iron.

=== Arbor ===
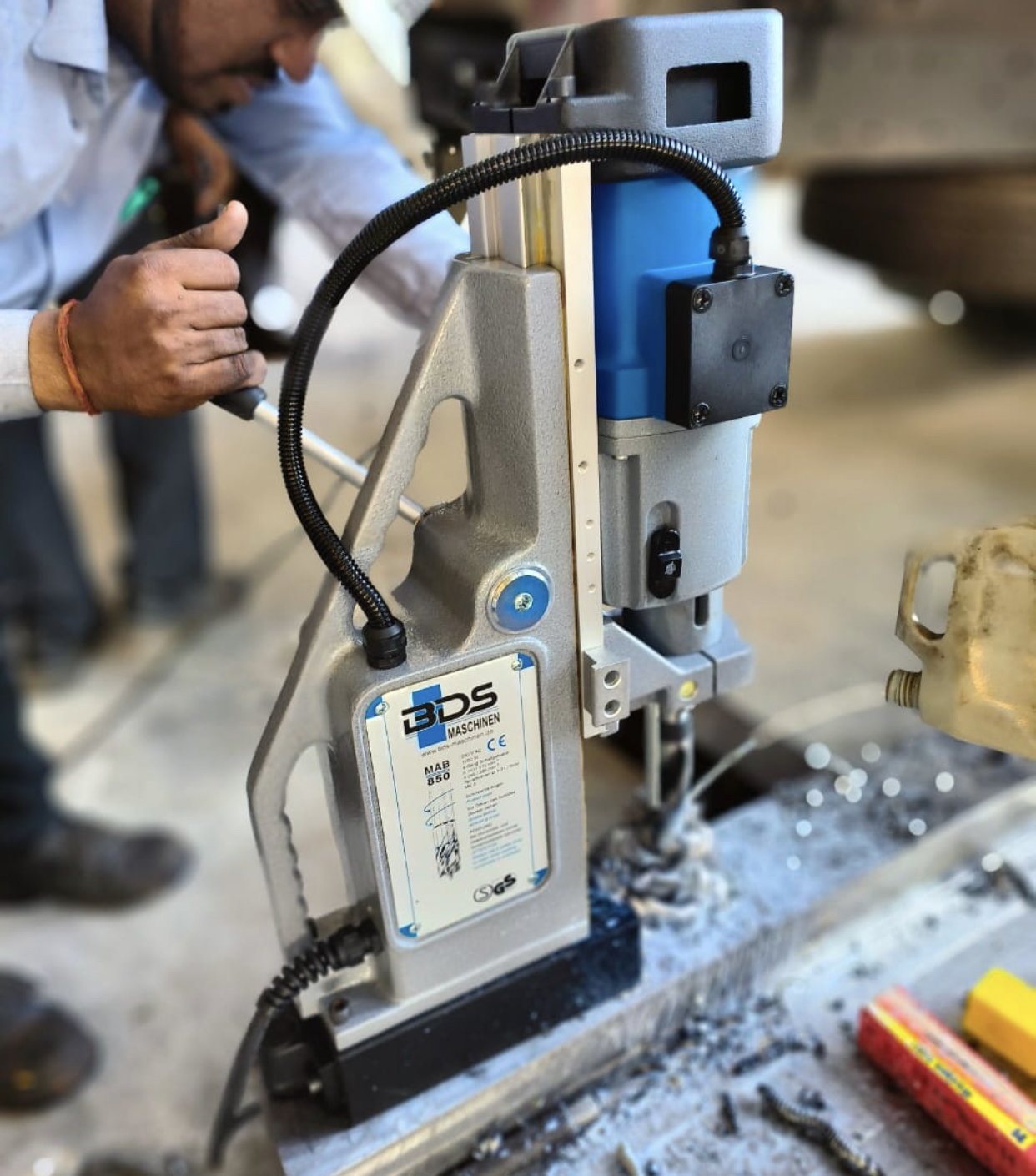
A morse taper 3 arbor equipped magnetic drill machine using taper shank drill bits

The arbor or chuck on a magnetic drill is attached to the motor. It is a type of clamp used to attach the core drills. There are mainly two types of chuck available for the magnetic drill, industrial arbor (manual tightening) and quick change drill chucks. The quick change drill chucks are easy and fast option to attach the core drills. They do not need to tighten the screws/jaws manually. The arbor or chucks have different types of spindle holder (machine taper) like Morse taper MT 2, MT 3, and MT 4. The chuck allows different types of core drill shafts (shanks) to fit in it.

== Types ==
Popular forms of magnetic drilling machine include:

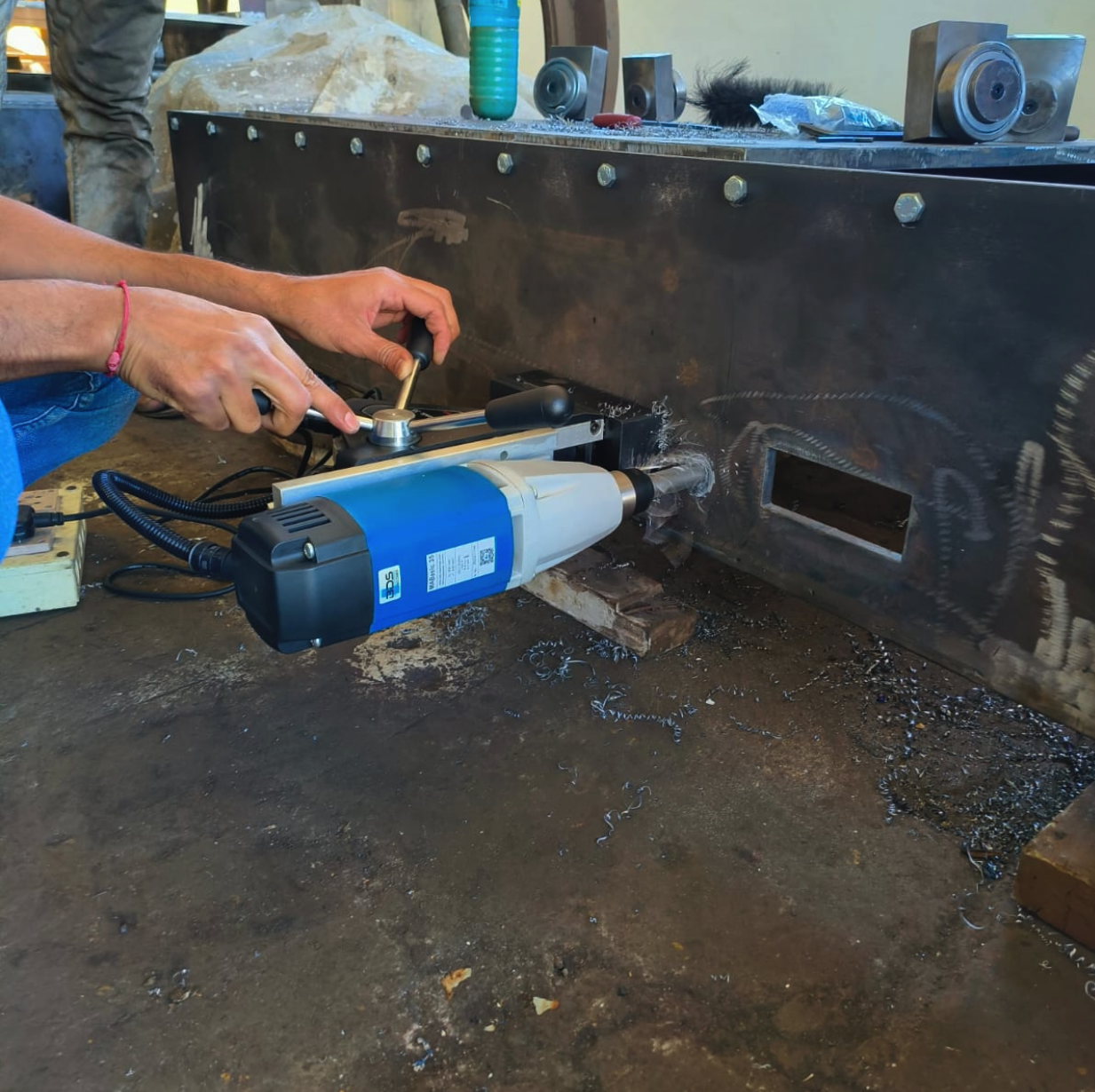
Lightweight magnetic drill machine used horizontally

=== Light weight ===
Very light weight types magnetic drills are very popular to perform several operations where the weight of a machine to carry is a great concern like working on an electric pole, mobile tower, TV tower, bridge, etc.

=== Automatic and semi-automatic feed ===
Magnetic core drilling machines with fully and semi-automatic drill feed are one of the most popular types of magnetic drilling machines. These machines help in saving time and energy and resulting in more production.

=== Pneumatic ===
Pneumatic core drilling machines are used where there is a danger of explosion or fire due to electrical sparking. The motor is driven by compressed air and the magnet is a permanent magnet instead of an electromagnet.

=== Cordless ===
Battery operated magnetic core drilling machines are used for a work place where there is no electricity. The motor is driven by a rechargeable battery. The magnet for these machines is either an electromagnet or a permanent magnet.

=== Horizontal ===
Horizontal magnetic core drilling machines with angular gears are made for confined drilling situations.

=== Cross-table base ===
Cross-table base magnetic drilling machines can also be used for light milling operations to make oval holes or key-slots. The cross-table enables the machines to move in X and Y Axis.

=== Pipe drilling or tube drilling ===
Magnetic drilling machines having clamping system with two permanent magnets automatically which adapts to the pipe diameter.

== Annular cutters ==
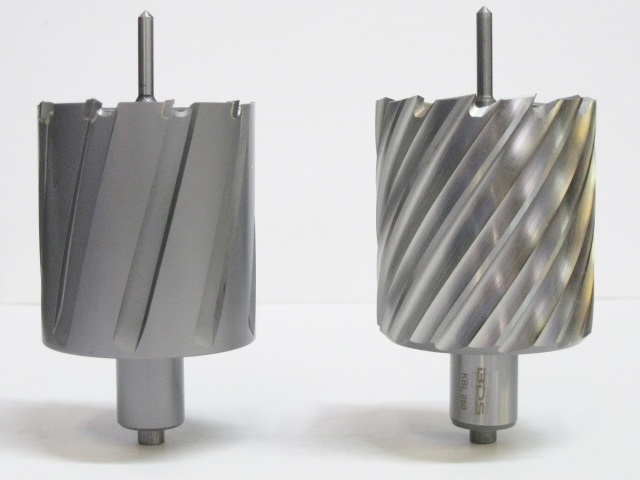
Annular cutters in tungsten carbide tip (TCT) and high-speed steel (HSS)

The magnetic core drilling machine utilizes core drills or annular cutters.

With a cutter wall thickness of approximately 5 mm only a small amount of material around the edge of a hole is removed by an annular cutter. Numerous teeth remain sharper longer than the single pointed tip of a spiral drill. Holes produced are smooth and burr-free - no reaming is required.

== Operation ==
Drilling holes with a magnetic drilling machine is a three-step process:

1. The pilot pin accurately centers the cutter over the area to be drilled.
2. During drilling, the pilot pin retracts and allows the internal lubrication to reach the cutting teeth.
3. When the hole is complete, the slug/core is automatically ejected from the cutter, leaving an accurate, finished hole.

High-quality precision-engineered cutters may have tapered inner walls. These help offset the effect of frictional heat build-up that causes expansion of both the cutter and waste slug being produced by the cutting action, allowing ready ejection of the slug upon completion.

== See also ==
- Drill stand, perpendicular feed device for hand-held drilling machine
