= Sea Lion (battery-electric locomotive) =

Sea Lion was a battery-electric locomotive with a 2-foot gauge, built by Wingrove & Rogers in 1921 as works no. 313 for the Groudle Glen Railway on the Isle of Man. Together with its sister, Polar Bear, it was intended that they would replace Sea Lion, and Polar Bear, two Bagnall steam locomotivess of the same names. However, the battery locomotives were not hugely successful, with Sea Lion being scrapped in 1922 following an incident where it fell down the side of the Groudle Glen.

== Replica ==
It has been proposed to build a replica Sea Lion at the Amberley Museum Railway, home of Polar Bear, using the frames of 1953-built Wingrove & Rogers loco no. 5031, which has been used at Amberley as a spares donor. The replica would be built initially as a static exhibit, with the potential for it to be made operational.
