= Annular cutter =

Form of core drill

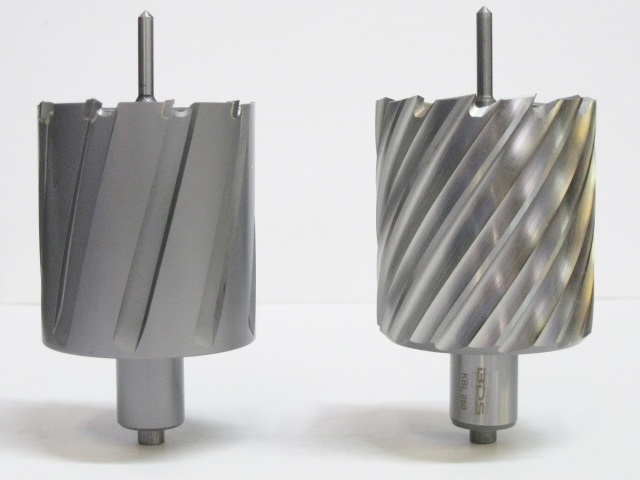
A tungsten carbide tipped (TCT) and high-speed steel (HSS) annular cutter (also known as a "core drill" or "hole saw")

An annular cutter (also called a core drill, core cutter, broach cutter, trepanning drill, hole saw, or cup-type cutter) is a form of core drill used to create holes in metal. An annular cutter, named after the annulus shape, cuts only a groove at the periphery of the hole and leaves a solid core or slug at the center.

An annular cutter is a more expensive and efficient alternative to spiral drill bits and standard hole saws. An annular cutter is similar to a hole saw but differs in geometry and material. The two most common types are high-speed steel (HSS) and tungsten carbide tipped (TCT).

Like a hole saw, but unlike a spiral drill bit, an annular cutter cuts only the periphery of a hole, leaving a circular "slug" at the center.

Annular cutters are best used with a drill press or magnetic drilling machine, both for their stability against high torque forces created by such a drill bit and lower RPMs compared to other types of drills.

== History ==
The annular cutter was patented in 1973. The high-speed steel type was patented 1983, and tungsten carbide tipped in 1985.

== Qualities ==
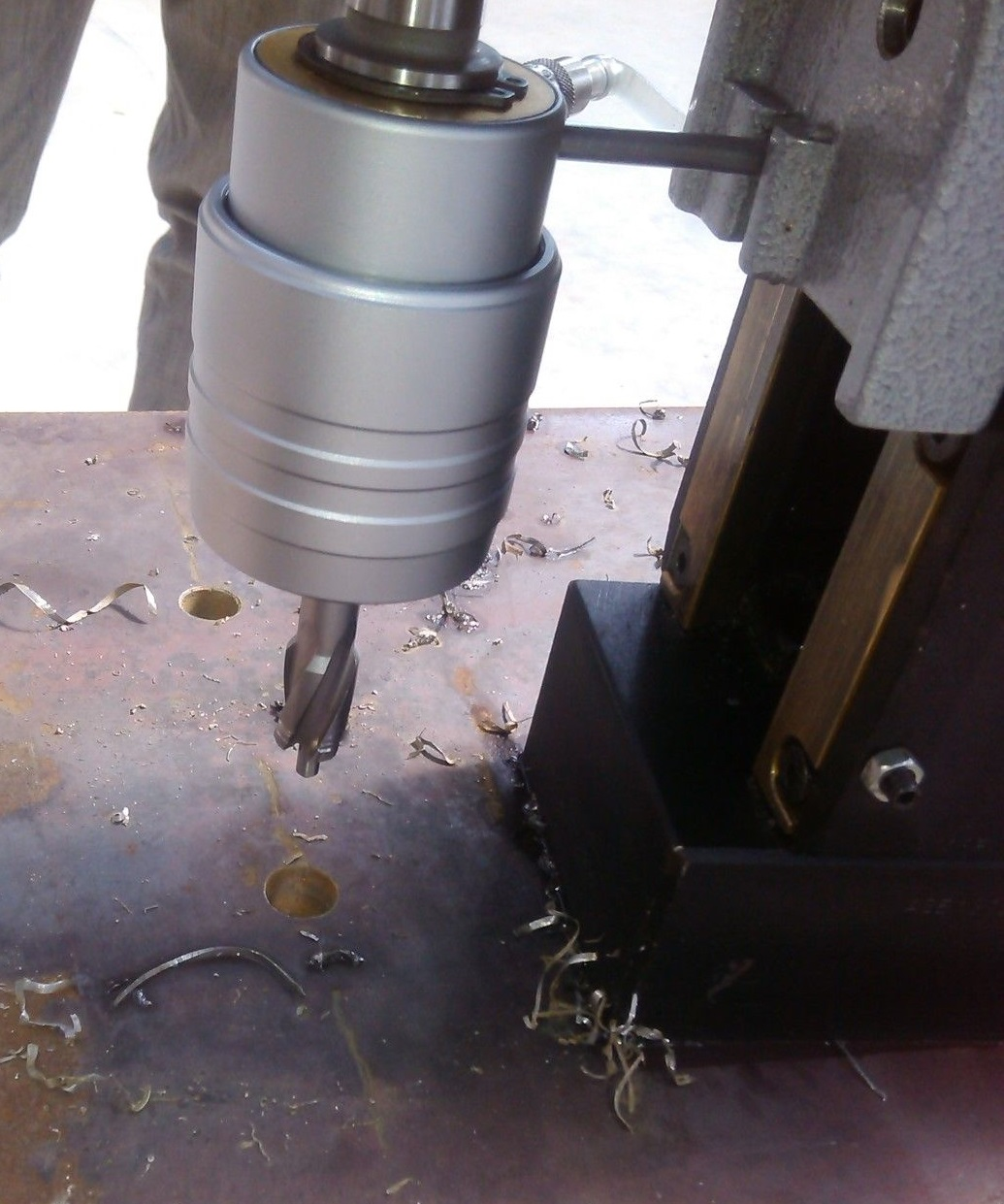
A perfect 14 mm diameter hole made by a TCT annular cutter

=== Time saving ===
As an annular cutter cuts only on the periphery of the hole to be made, which cuts and removes the complete material of the hole, annular cutters are considered to be 3 to 4 times faster than conventional drill bits. Also, while using a twist drill bit or metal hole saw, one has to do pre-drilling and step-drilling operations for bigger diameter holes, whereas an annular cutter requires no pre-drilling and step-drilling. It is a one-shot drilling operation.

The annular cutters have fewer teeth and less wear, therefore with an annular cutter holes can be made at a higher or faster cutting speed and a faster feed rate of the drilling machine.

=== Energy Saving ===
Because annular cutters do not have to drill/cut through the complete workpiece, they require less thrust and thus less energy to drill through material.

=== Cooling System ===
The cooling of annular cutters is internal. The internal lubrication is provided through a hole with the help of a pilot pin. Internal lubrication makes the annular cutter faster and more efficient for deep-hole drilling.

=== Usage ===
As the annular cutters require very low RPM (from min 50 RPM), these cutters are often used with light-duty drilling machines or portable magnetic base drilling machines.

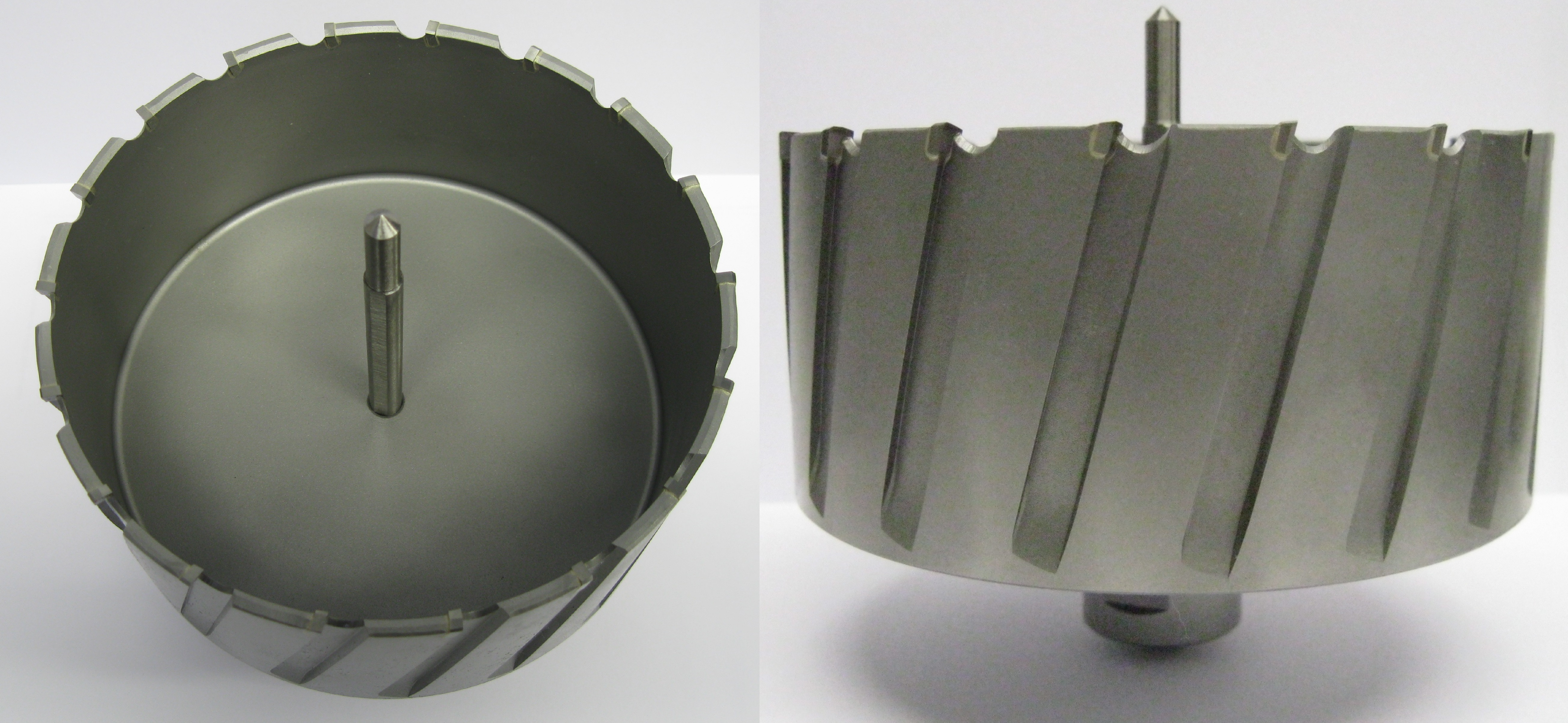
150 mm dimater X 55 mm length TCT Core Drill

=== Sizes ===
Annular cutters come in a variety of sizes. Annular cutters are available from 12 mm (1/2’’) in diameter to 200 mm (7 7/8’’) and larger. Depths of 30 mm, 55 mm, 75 and 110 mm are commonly available. Annular cutters start from 12 mm diameter up to 150 mm diameter and more if required. Various cutting depths (lengths) of annular cutters can be sourced depending on the requirement.

=== Re-sharpening ===
HSS annular cutter can be easily re-sharpened on a grinding machine and can be reused for drilling. Re-grinding can be done until the desired cutting length is available on the annular cutter.

== Types ==
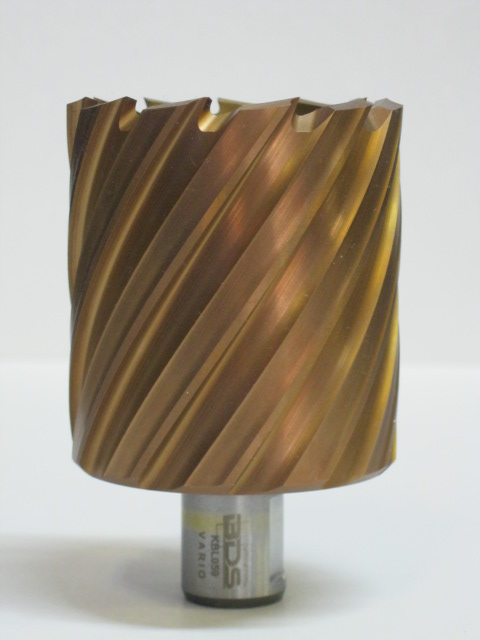
HSS core drill with Hard Coating for more heat resistance and longer life time.

The types of core drills are categorized by the material used to manufacture them: Primarily a metal core drill is made from High-Speed Steel and Tungsten Carbide Tips. So commercially the types of core drills are HSS core drills and TCT core drills.

=== High-speed steel (HSS) ===
HSS core drills are made from high-speed steel material. These are the most popular core drills or annular cutters in the market. HSS core drills are cheaper for smaller diameters i.e. 40 mm. The HSS core drill, unlike the TCT core drills, has the ability to re-sharpen. HSS core drills are re-sharpened and used until the desirable length is remaining. HSS core drills have a longer service life, and high heat resistance: the characteristic of HSS core drills is that drilling with these core drills can be done without the use of excessive force.

==== Standard ====
The HSS Standard core drills are made from M2 steel. These core drills are one of the most popular core drills in Western countries due to their cost and resharpening advantage. The Standard HSS core drills are used to drill Mild and Structural steel, Aluminium, Stainless steel of lower BHN., etc.

==== Cobalt ====
The HSS Cobalt are core drills made from M42 Steel. These core drills have 8% Cobalt in HSS. These core drills are harder than the Standard HSS core drills which gives better performance to drill harder material. A high percentage of Cobalt in HSS makes it faster, stronger, and durable. Cobalt HSS core drills are used to drill materials like Structural Steel, Stainless Steel, Cast iron, etc.

==== Hard coating ====
The HSS core drills with Hard Coating are core drills with a coating on them, generally TiN Coating. This makes the core drills more resistant to heat, longer tool life, and even removal of chips. These core drills are gaining a lot of popularity over the Standard HSS core drills these days. These core drills are used Structural steel, Stainless steel, etc.

=== Tungsten carbide tipped (TCT) ===
Tungsten carbide tipped (TCT) core drills have tungsten carbide on their tips, a very hard material suitable for cutting through tougher materials. TCT core drills are more expensive than HSS core drills but are faster and more efficient in making larger holes. TCT core drills are cheaper for bigger diameters i.e. above 41 mm. Tip breakage is more likely than with HSS core bits, and TCT bits may not be re-sharpened.

==== Standard ====
A Standard TCT core drill has tungsten carbide tips. These types of core drills are now available in a vast range of diameters, for up to 150 mm. These are popularly used core drills on magnetic core drilling machines. These core drills are popularly used to drill materials like railway tracks, structural steel, stainless steel, cast iron, etc.

==== Hard coating ====
The TCT core drills with Hard Coating are core drills with a coating on them, generally TiN Coating. This makes the core drills more resistant to heat, longer tool life, and even remove of chips just like the advantage of HSS core drill. The biggest advantage of hard-coated core drills is that these cutters are very good for cutting larger diameters on hard material. These core drills are popularly used to drill materials like corroded or weathered material, structural and stainless steel.

== Shanks ==
=== Weldon ===
"Weldon shank" annular cutters have 2 flats and this is the traditional method adopted by many of the popular magnetic drill manufacturers. "Weldon shank" annular cutters fix in the chuck by tightening grub screws in the two flat areas.

=== Universal ===
"Universal shank" annular cutters have one flat and three quick connect grooves. This is also a popular method for using annular cutters into mag drills quickly, without any strain of tightening grub screws. mostly "universal shank cutters" can be used in "weldon -shank machines, whereas weldon-shank annular cutters can't use in "one-touch" machines without the help of an extra adapter. While using "universal shank cutters" in "weldon shank" machines, the tightening area (flat area) is only one, which is also not 100% sufficient to tighten both screws.

== Drilling tubes and pipes ==
Annular cutters can also be used to make holes in pipes and tubes without dimpling and deburring.

To make a hole in a tube or pipe easily an annular cutter should be used with a magnetic base drilling machine and a tube/pipe clamping device. The tube clamping device is a metallic device that is clamped on the tube with an adjustable chain. After clamping the device the magnetic drilling machine is placed on the device, which gets clamped to the device by switching on its magnet.

With the help of magnetic drilling machines' proper RPM, the annular cutter makes a perfect hole in the tube.

Generally, a HSS annular cutter is used to make holes in tubes and pipes, as the TCT annular cutters have more chances of cutting teeth breakage due to curved surfaces of tubes and pipes.

As annular cutters are hollow there is no dead zone resistance. The cutting takes place only on the periphery of the hole to be made. Annular cutters distribute the load equally on the periphery of the hole with its multiple cutting edges, thus the required thrust and energy are also much less comparatively.

== Drilling rail and tracks ==
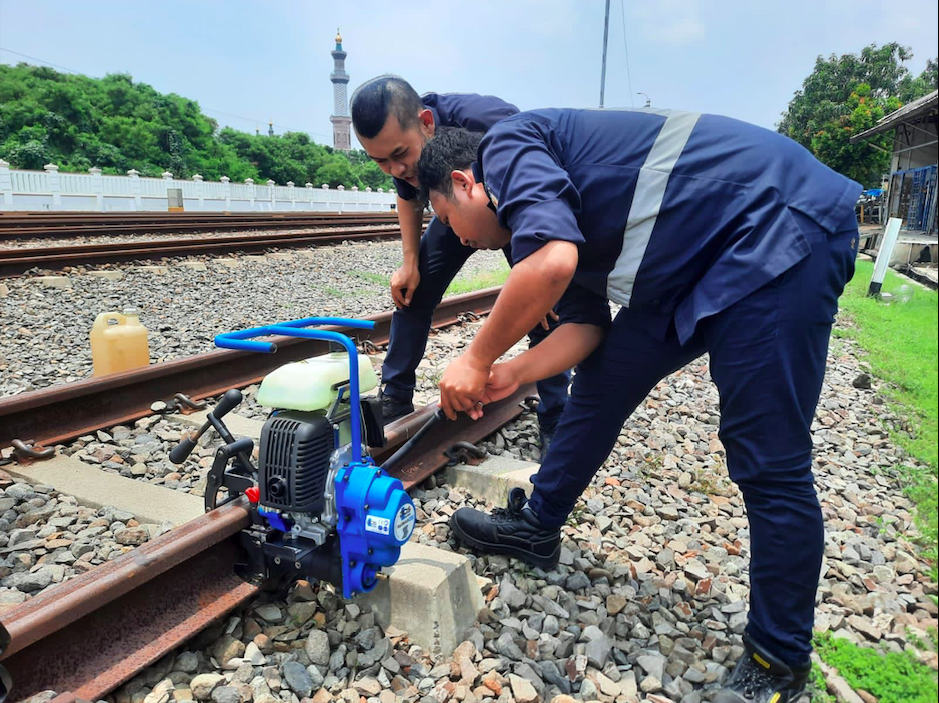
Rail drilling machines drilling holes with rail annular cutters

Annular cutters are also manufactured with special grade, especially for drilling railway tracks. Rail annular cutters are designed for railroad rail drilling operations. The rail annular cutters with special manufacturing technology are made to drill very hard and corroded material like rail. Rail annular cutters are available in HSS and TCT types, though TCT rail cutters are more popular worldwide.

== Comparison between HSS and TCT core drills ==
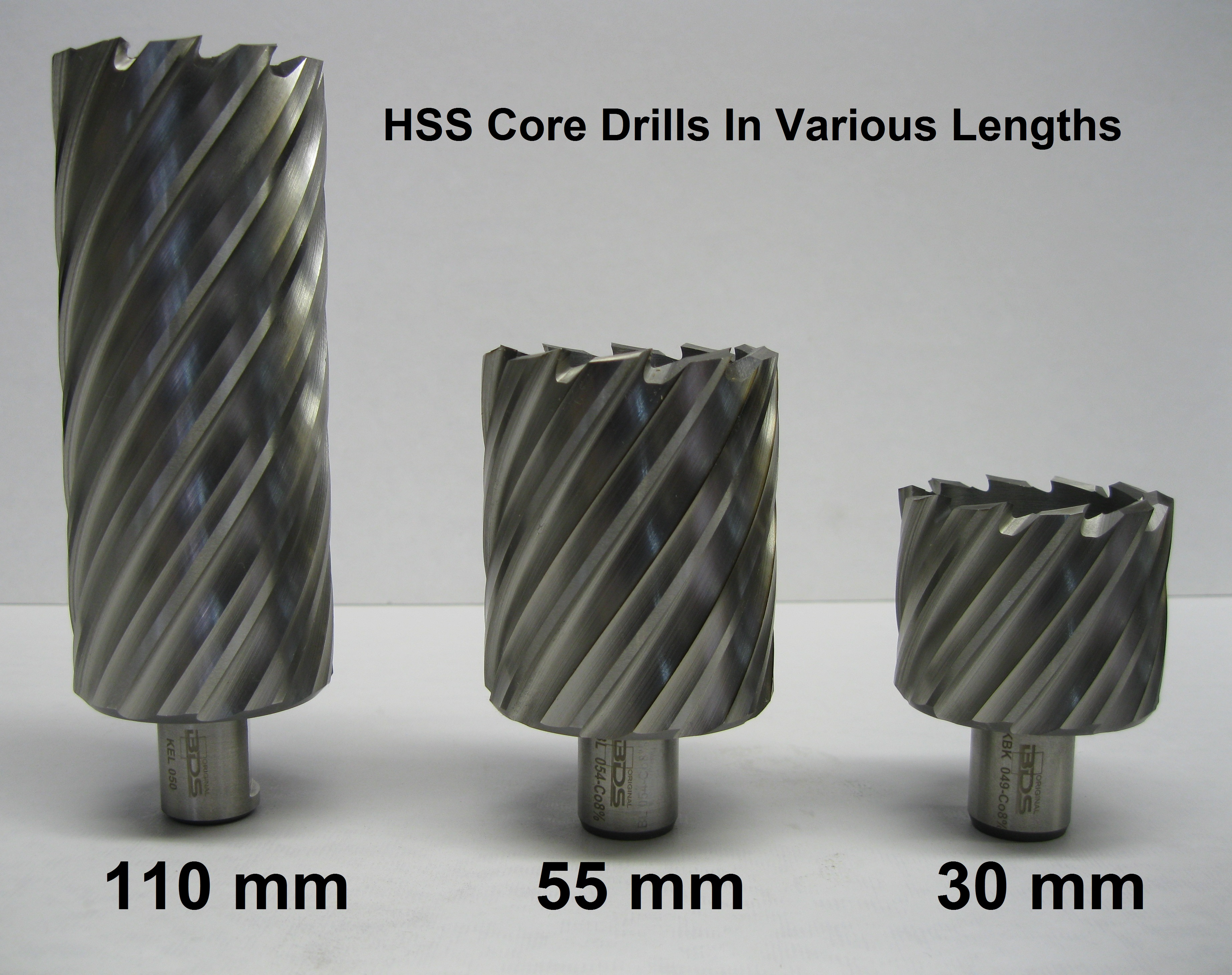
HSS Core Drills in various sizes

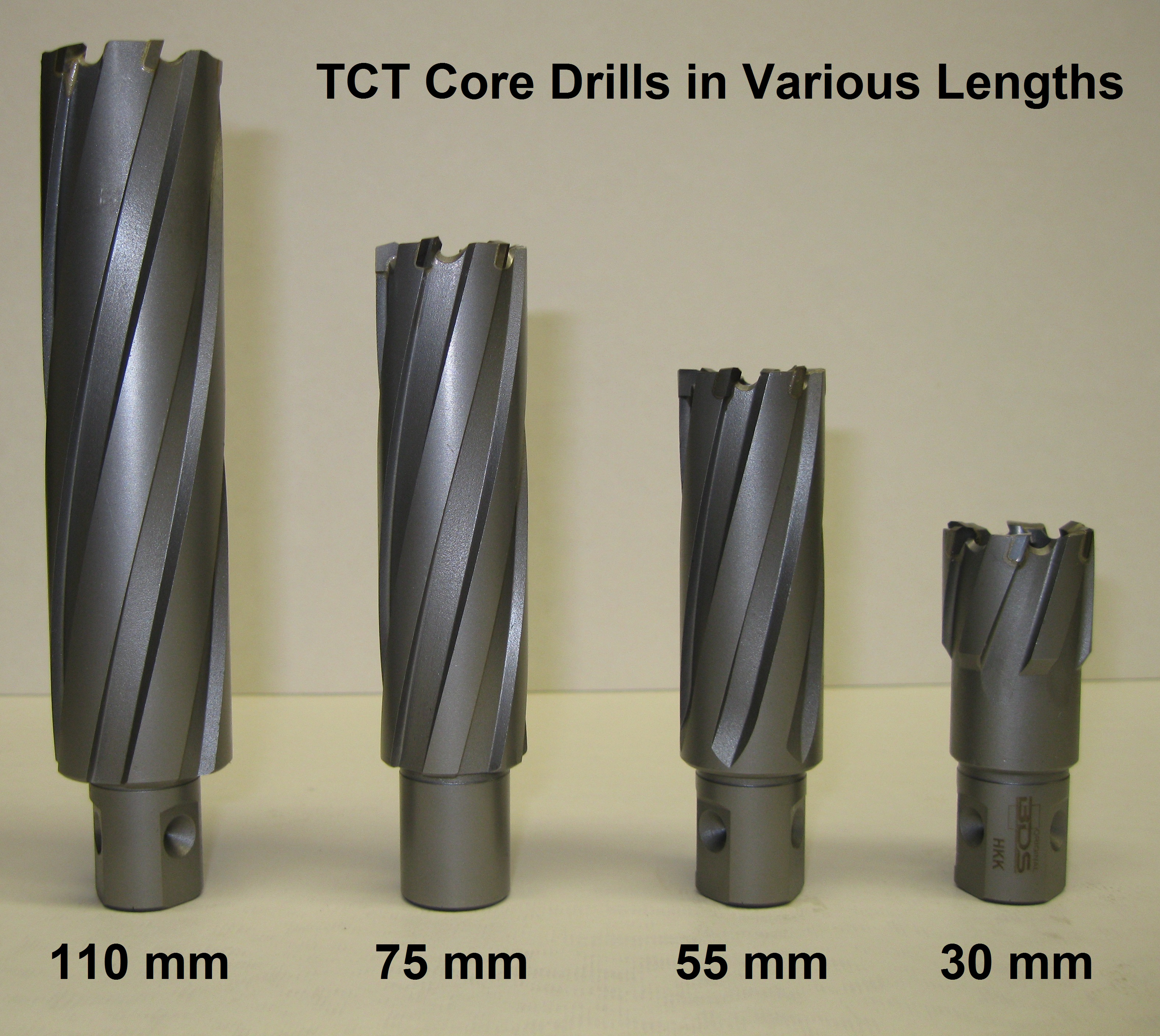
TCT Core Drills in various sizes

=== Cost ===
HSS core drills are cheaper than the TCT core drills for smaller diameters up to 40 mm, while TCT core drills are cheaper than HSS for diameters above 41 mm.

=== Re-sharpening ===
Once the HSS cutter loses its sharpness, it can be re-ground on a grinding machine and can be used again. Similarly, re-grinding the TCT core drills is possible, but takes more time.

=== Defect ===
The chances of defects in TCT core drills are higher because the tungsten carbide tips are glued to the core drill and when the core drill falls down or crashes on the material, the chances of tip breakage are higher. HSS cutters on the other hand are less likely to fail that way since they are completely made out of a single material.

=== Speed ===
TCT cutters are used to cut harder materials with ease. Especially for boring larger diameter holes in hard materials, TCT core drills can be used to great success. Comparatively, HSS core drills are more often used for drilling softer materials and for small-diameter hole sizes.

=== Hardness ===
The teeth on TCT core drills are harder than HSS, allowing them to cut more difficult materials.

== Disadvantages of annular cutters ==
The biggest disadvantage of a core drill or annular cutter is that it can not drill blind holes. A core drill, due to its hollow geometry, can only make it through holes. The cost of a core drill is high compared to a twist drill, but the cost per hole made with the core drill is less as compared to twist drills, this is because a single core drill makes 5 to 10 times more holes than a twist drill.

Annular cutters are more fragile than a drill bits of the same diameter and may thus shatter more easily. They are also more difficult to remove if stuck, as they have a larger contact area with the workpiece than a regular drill bit.

== Cooling lubricants ==
The use of lubricant or coolant is important with any type of annular cutter to deliver longer life from the cutter. TCT annular cutters require coolant not a lubricant, and HSS annular cutters required cutting oil not coolant.

Overhead drilling with liquid lubricants can cause damage to the motor of the drilling machine. High performance cutting paste can be used in both overhead and normal orientation and is suitable for both HSS and TCT cutters as well as for thread cutting taps and dies.

== Ejector pin ==
The ejector pin (also called a pilot pin) has three major functions:

- Centering - The ejector pin is exactly positioned to the center punch mark. Switch the magnet on and the machine and annular cutter are in the drilling position.
- Oiling - Cutting oil for automatic internal lubrication is supplied via the ejector pin.
- Ejecting - The spring-loaded ejector pin pushes the core out of the drill hole made by the annular cutter.

== Cutting speed ==
The magnetic drilling machines are provided with speed gears and some machines are also equipped with variable speed control. As per the diameter of the annular cutter and the type of annular cutter the speed of the magnetic drilling machine has to be set.

The formula for calculating the speed is:

$n=\frac{v\,x\,1000}{d\,x\,\pi}=min^{-1}$

d = diameter of the annular cutter in mm.

v = cutting speed of the annular cutters.

== HSS vs TCT annular cutters ==
Trade-offs between HSS and TCT annular cutters include:

- Cost - HSS annular cutters are cheaper than the TCT for smaller diameters up to 40 mm, while TCT are cheaper for diameters above 41 mm.
- Re-sharpening - A HSS annular cutter can be resharpened while re-grinding a TCT is possible but more difficult due to the geometry needed for carbide. Unless carbide is ground properly it can break easily.
- Breakage - HSS cutters are made of one piece of steel, while TCT cutters have brazed teeth, which can break or shatter more easily.
- Speed - TCT cutters are faster, especially for larger diameter holes
- Hardness - TCT cutters can drill through harder materials due to the carbide tips.
