= Robert Hudson (company) =

English manufacturer

Robert Hudson (Raletrux) Ltd.
- Formerly: Robert Hudson Ltd
- Industry: Manufacturing
- Founded: 1865 in Gildersome, England
- Founder: Robert Hudson
- Defunct: 1984
- Fate: Liquidation
- Headquarters: Leeds, England
- Area served: England, South Africa, India
- Products: Locomotives; Narrow gauge railway parts; Ropeway conveyor parts; Mine cars; Dumper trucks; Cranes

Robert Hudson Ltd was a major international supplier of light railway materials, based in Gildersome, near Leeds, England. The name was later changed to Robert Hudson (Raletrux) Ltd.

== The business ==
The business was founded in 1865 by Robert Hudson at Gildersome, near Leeds. The Hudson family owned the local Victoria Colliery in Bruntcliffe, Morley. To improve access to the works a connection with the Great Northern Railway main line from Wakefield to Bradford was established in 1890 thus allowing raw materials and finished goods to be transported by rail. A head office was established in Meadow Lane, in the centre of Leeds, which was ideal for customers arriving by rail. This was principally the sales and design office. Substantial Robert Hudson subsidiaries traded in South Africa from 1890 and India in 1907.

The Gildersome works occupied a 38-acre (150,000 m^{2}) site, and included an iron and steel foundry with two Bessemer furnaces, machine shops, erecting shops, pattern making and a detail drawing office. To transport material around the site a hand worked 2 ft (610 mm) gauge tramway was used.

A wagon load of narrow gauge track points, loaded at Hudson's on 14 December 1953, caused a spectacular derailment at Longniddry Junction near Edinburgh at 00.41 on 17 December. The top set of points came loose when the rope broke and fouled the up line just as an express parcels train approached. The parcels locomotive and vans destroyed much of the station platform and its fireman was killed.

== Robert Hudson ==
In 1844, Hudson served as a member of the Provisional Committee for the Leeds and West Riding Junction Railways. In 1845, Hudson likewise served as Provisional Committee member for the Bradford, Wakefield, and Midland Railway Company; later in 1845, Hudson had been named a Director of the company, at which time he participated as a Provisional Committee member for the Stockton, Northallerton and Leeds Railway.

== Overseas branches ==
In 1890, offices and stores were opened in Johannesburg, South Africa, for the supply of light railway materials to the diamond and gold mining industries. In 1907 an Agency was opened in Calcutta for the development of the Indian trade. Subsequently a works and offices were built at Kidderpore, near Calcutta. The branches in India were overseen by a general manager, who in 1934 was C. A. J. Hendry. There was also an office in Cairo to serve Egypt and North Africa.

In 1927 the first South African works was built in Durban. This was followed by a works near Johannesburg, which was replaced in 1948 when a large new works was erected at Benoni, near Johannesburg.

Between the First World War and Second World War the largest project Hudson were involved in was the supply of the complete equipment required for the Luanda railway in Portuguese West Africa. The permanent way alone cost over £900,000 sterling and consumed 80,000 long tons (90,000 short tons; 81,000 t) of British steel.

== Products ==
The company's primary products were vehicles and trackwork for narrow gauge railways but also included aerial ropeway systems. The range of items supplied was very extensive and included supporting equipment such as platelayers' tools.

To support the main business and provide a complete service to the customer, Robert Hudson supplied almost any related equipment. To achieve this range of products, many of the items were bought in. A typical example of this is weighbridges that were supplied by Denison's Foundry in Leeds.

=== Wagons ===
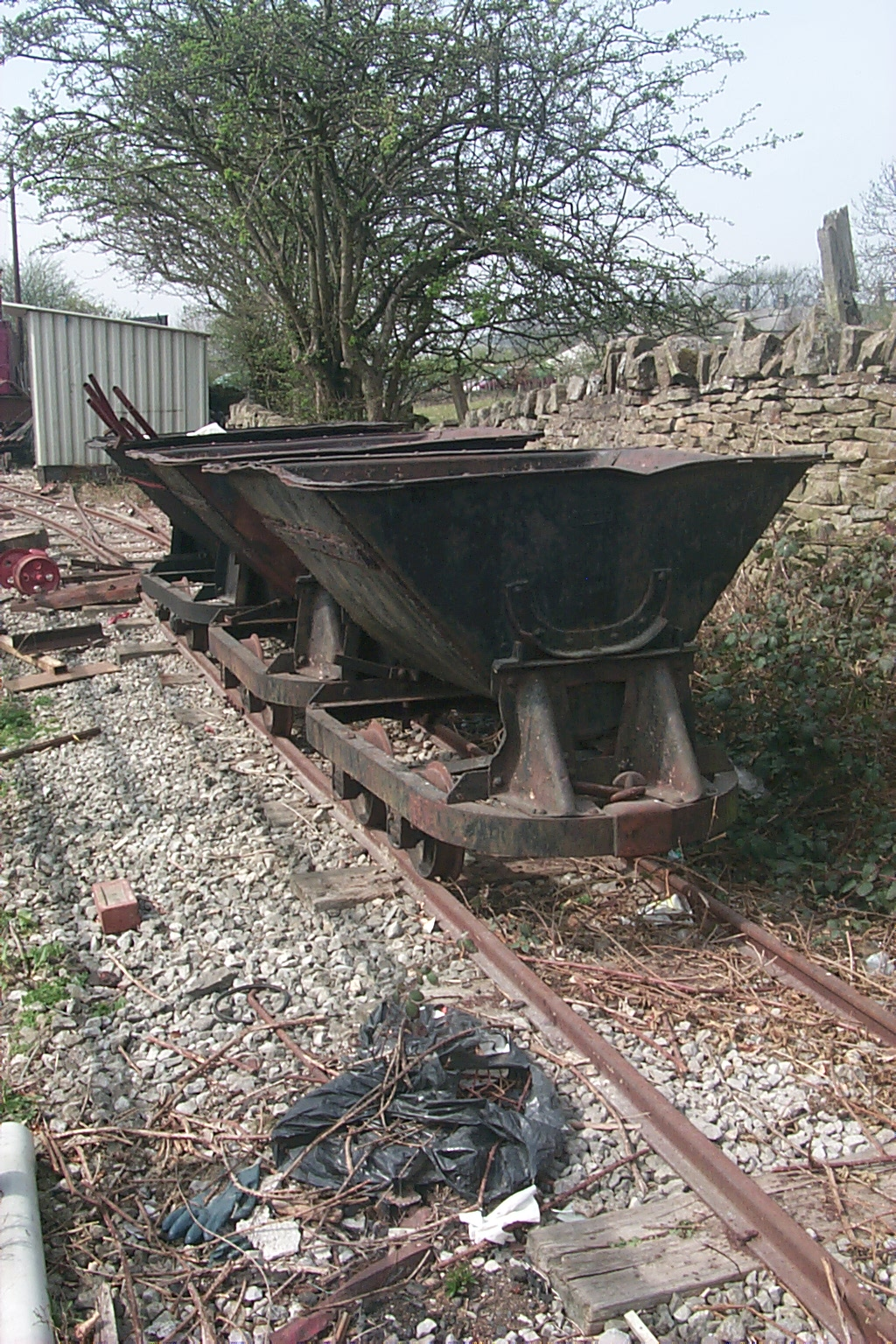
Hudson tipper wagons preserved at Embsay station

In 1875 Hudson patented the "triple centre" side tipping truck. This truck is of triangular section and has support frames at each end with three pivot points. The centre pivot being the normal rest position whilst the two outer pivots being used for tipping left or right. This arrangement allows the contents to be easily removed by one man without overturning the truck. Another innovation that Hudson introduced was the use of hydraulic machinery to form pressed steel components. The use of corrugation as part of the pressing process also helped to provide a strong body with thinner gauge steel. This combination provided a competitive advantage that contributed to Hudson's success.

Types of wagon produced by Robert Hudson Ltd were many and varied. Principal types included the tipping wagon mentioned above, in all gauges up to standard gauge, and typified by the "Rugga" tipping wagon, introduced in the 1930s to replace the earlier Victory skip wagons. Rugga wagons were primarily produced for 2 ft (610 mm) and 600 mm (1 ft 11 5/8 in) gauges, but like all Hudson products, could be manufactured to any gauge required. Rugga wagons were built in a range of sizes from the smallest at 13.5 cu ft or 0.50 cu yd or 0.38 m^{3} up to a huge 54 cu ft or 2.0 cu yd or 1.5 m^{3}. Variations included "light" versions for hand-tramming, medium duty for light work using locomotives, through to heavy duty for more extreme conditions and materials such as rocks. The heavier duty versions had thicker metal bodies, double ball bearing races in each axlebox and usually a central stiffening girder. Hudson boasted that " at any time several thousand Rugga wagons are in stock, for immediate delivery"

Another principal product was mine tubs, found in almost all UK collieries and similar operations elsewhere in the British Empire. Again, versions included different capacities, hand, winding engine or loco haulage, as well as being manufactured in all gauges.

Other wagon types included "U" skips for tunnelling, Granby cars, flat wagons, cane cars for sugar cane, carriages, kiln cars, timber bolsters, box cars. hopper wagons, anode and cathode cars, bottom discharge wagons, ammunition wagons, concrete pouring skip wagons.

=== Track and track components ===
Hudson supplied a vast array of track components, from the rail in all of its multitude of sections and weights per yard, through to individual bolts, nuts and washers . The smallest rail section is usually found around 12 lb/yd (5.95 kg/m), while the heaviest rail shown in the 1957 catalogue is 60 lb/yd (29.8 kg/m). With the rail, Hudson supplied fishplates and bolts to suit, spikes for wooden rails, chairs and screws for wooden rails, metal sleepers of various sections, including clips and bolts.

Specialist track components such as turntables , switches (points), point levers, mine transfer cars, temporary turnouts, easy turnouts, rerailing ramps, could all be found in the catalogues. And the tools required to build and maintain the track, including gauges, rail benders, rail cutters, rail drills, rail spike hammers, spike removal levers, spanners for various track bolts. A huge array of parts with a vast range of applications.

When the British Expeditionary Force in France in 1916 suffered from the appalling ground conditions, which restricted the supply of materials to the front line, a report by Sir Eric Geddes of the North Eastern Railway recommended implementation for 600 mm (1 ft 11 5/8 in) gauge railways, following which the War Office ordered 7,000 miles (11,000 km) of prefabricated track, the majority of which was sent to France, along with around 6,000 tipping wagons and 5,000 bogie wagons of varying designs. Almost everything supplied was made to Robert Hudson designs, albeit by various manufacturers.

=== Steam locomotives ===
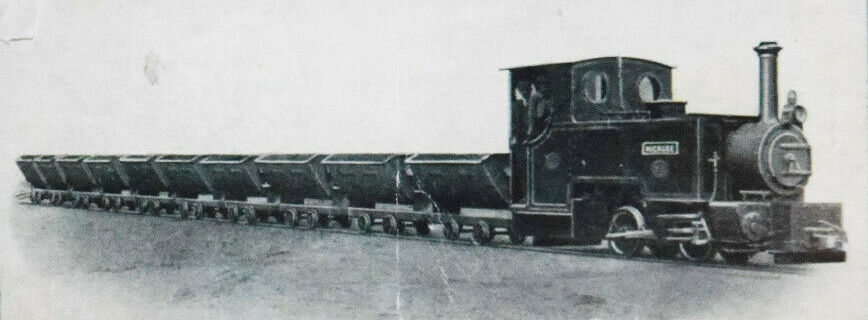
One of Robert Hudson's narrow gauge steam locomotives, 1915

In 1911 Robert Hudson entered into an agreement with Hudswell Clarke for the manufacture of narrow gauge locomotives, an agreement which ran from 1911 through 1929. This arrangement produced 16 standardised designs, designated A to Q, which ranged from 0-4-0T 5 hp engines to 0-6-0T 55 hp models. The designs were sufficiently flexible to allow for the various track gauges in use. Over the years, 188 locomotives were supplied to these designs.

=== Petrol and diesel locomotives ===
Hudsons also realised the advantages of the internal combustion locomotive and the 1915 catalogue offered a range of five petrol locomotive supplied by Avonside Engine Company of Bristol.

When the Fordson petrol tractor became widely available in the 1920s Hudsons adapted this unit to make a simple locomotive. The locomotive used a four-wheeled cast chassis to which a roller chain drive connected to the tractor axle. The tractor gearbox had three forward speeds but only one reverse gear, which clearly was a limitation for a locomotive that has to operate bi-directionally. Only a few of these machines were constructed but fortunately a 2 ft (610 mm) gauge, 1928 model is preserved at the Armley Mills Industrial Museum, Leeds. The oldest working Hudson Hunslet engine '1944', (built in 1939) has just been restored, complete with her original Ailsa Craig 20 hp engine, and is preserved at the Old Kiln Light Railway, Tilford, Surrey.

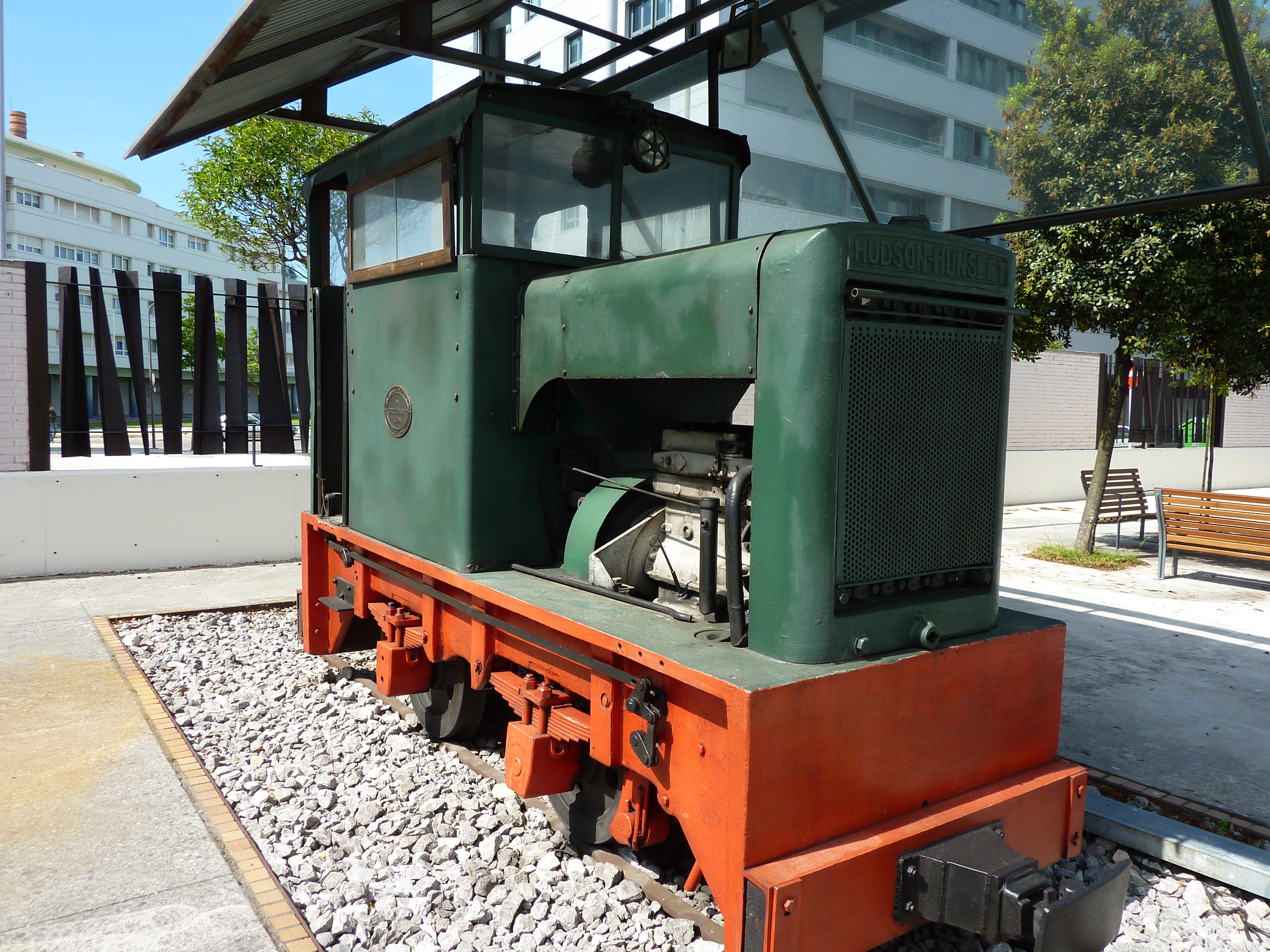
Diesel locomotive Hudson Hunslet No 4178 in the Gijón Railway Museum

The manufacture of internal combustion locomotives was not pursued and Hudsons often supplied Avonside Engine Company or Kerr Stuart units to their customers. When the Hunslet Engine Company took over these designs it was only logical that Hudsons would form a partnership with Hunslet. The first locomotive to carry the Hudson Hunslet plate was in March 1937. The locomotive frame was a one piece casting and the power was delivered by a chain drive and friction clutch from a 20 hp (15 kW) Ailsa Craig CF2 diesel engine. Subsequently 25 hp (19 kW), 30 hp (22 kW), 40 hp (30 kW) and 50 hp (37 kW) versions were built. A 1944 version is also preserved at the Armley Mills Industrial Museum in Leeds. In the 1950s these designs were refined and the 20 hp (15 kW) unit relabelled 21 hp (16 kW). In practice differences were small, the driver was given a seated position, the height was lower and the bonnet or hood was fitted with sloping sides and removable engine covers.

In 1968 Hudson ventured into locomotive manufacture again and produced two experimental locomotives (works numbers LX1001 and LX1002) using Gardner engines and hydraulic transmission. Both of these locomotives are preserved by the Moseley Railway Trust.

=== Mining equipment ===
Hudson was a major player in setting the standards for coal haulage. In the 1930s the introduction of practical locomotive haulage in coal mines demanded better wagons than the traditional plain bearing designs. Hudson introduced new designs with pressed steel corrugated bodies with roller bearing wheels. This style of vehicle was ultimately adopted by the National Coal Board as its standard coal haulage vehicle.

=== Catalogue ===
The catalogue issued in 1957, illustrates the vast range of products and consisted of nine separate books:-

- Section A – Track and Track Accessories. Turnouts and Switches and Crossings. Turntables and Easy Turnouts. Platelayers tools.
- Section B – Contractors' and Quarry type Tipping Wagons and Miscellaneous Light Tipping Wagons.
- Section C – Double Side Tipping Wagons, Double End Tipping Wagons, Tippler Trucks, and Box Cars for Mining and Tunnelling.
- Section D – Mine Cars Cane, Sisal and Fruit Cars. Trailers. Platform and Tank Wagons. Brick Cars and Industrial Trucks. Logging Bogies and Estate Cars.
- Section G – Wheels, Axles, and Axle boxes.

Springs. Lubrication. Brakes and Braking. Buffers and Coupling. Parts and Attachments for Wagons. Special Steels.

- Section L – HUDSON/HUNSLET Steam and Light Diesel Locos

=== Road vehicles ===
In the 1960s, Hudson introduced a range of road vehicles. The "Leedsall" dumper truck was first produced in 1966. This was followed by the "Kiwi" mobile yardcrane, the "Timser" low loading trailer and the "Frontomatic" concrete truckmixer. These developments initially provided replacement work for the declining orders for railway equipment and to consolidate this, a Contractor's Equipment division was formed in 1964. In 1968 a separate building was opened on the main Wakefield-Bradford Road with showrooms and land for demonstration purposes. With the demise of the Gildersome works the company became a sales and service organisation for construction plant and machinery e.g. Ford, Barford, Kubota.

In 1981 the much reduced Raletrux business relocated to Mill Green in the Wortley district of Leeds, however, the declining railway business finally took its toll in 1984 when the company was liquidated. The remaining plant, machinery, stores and equipment were auctioned on 31 January 1985 at the Mill Green works. The goodwill passed to NEI Becorit and ultimately to Clayton Equipment, based in Derby, who are still very active in the narrow gauge railway industry and using the Robert Hudson name in their marketing.

== Sources ==
- Robinson, Phillip (2012). The Standard "Rugga" Tipping Wagon from Robert Hudson Ltd. Moseley Railway Trust. ISBN 978-0954087883.
- Robinson, P. (2014) An Unusual Survivor. The story of narrow gauge Hudswell Clarke locomotive 1238 of 1916 supplied by Robert Hudson Ltd. Published by Moseley Railway Trust
- Robert Hudson Limited, (1957) Hudson Light Railway Materials General Catalogue 57, published by the company. A fully bound sections A–L edition is in the collection of North of England Institute of Mining and Mechanical Engineers at Y69.48 HUD.
