= Core drill =

Drill specifically designed to remove a cylinder of material

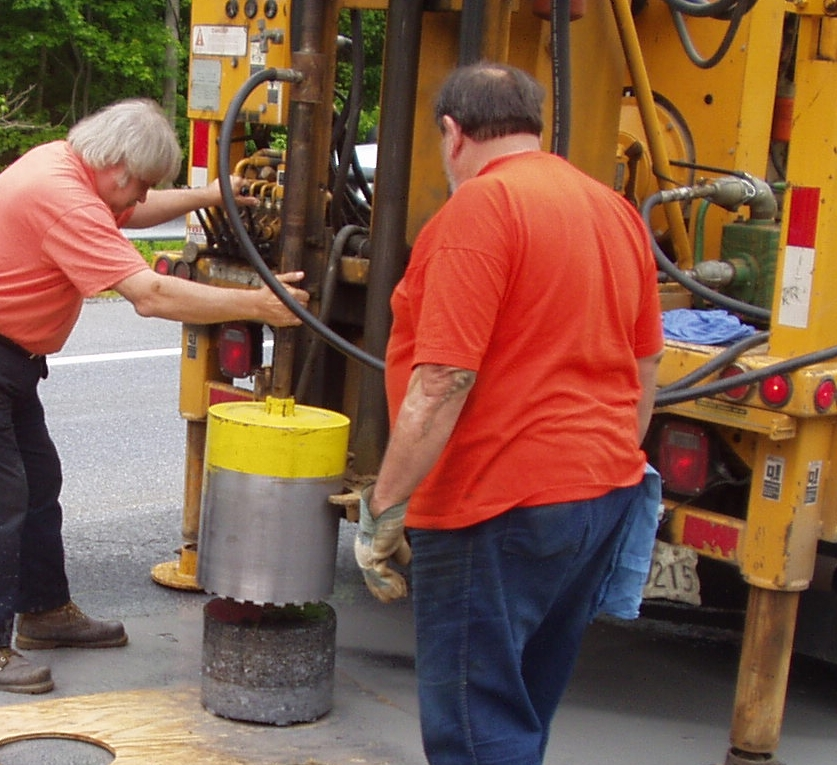
Truck-mounted core drill

A modern core drill is a drill specifically designed to remove a cylinder of material, much like a hole saw. The material left inside the drill bit is referred to as the core.

Core drills used in metal are called annular cutters. Core drills used for concrete and hard rock generally use industrial diamond grit as the abrasive material and may be electrical, pneumatic or hydraulic powered. Core drills are commonly water cooled, and the water also carries away the fine waste as a slurry. For drilling masonry, carbide core drills can be used, but diamond is more successful when cutting through rebar.

The earliest core drills were those used by the ancient Egyptians, invented in 3000 BC. Core drills are used for many applications, either where the core needs to be preserved (the drilling apparatus used in obtaining a core sample is often referred to as a corer), or where drilling can be done more rapidly since much less material needs to be removed than with a standard bit. This is the reason that diamond-tipped core drills are commonly used in construction to create holes for pipes, manholes, and other large-diameter penetrations in concrete or stone.

Core drills are used frequently in mineral exploration where the drill string may be several hundred to several thousand feet in length. The core samples are recovered and examined by geologists for mineral percentages and stratigraphic contact points. This gives exploration companies the information necessary to begin or abandon mining operations in a particular area.

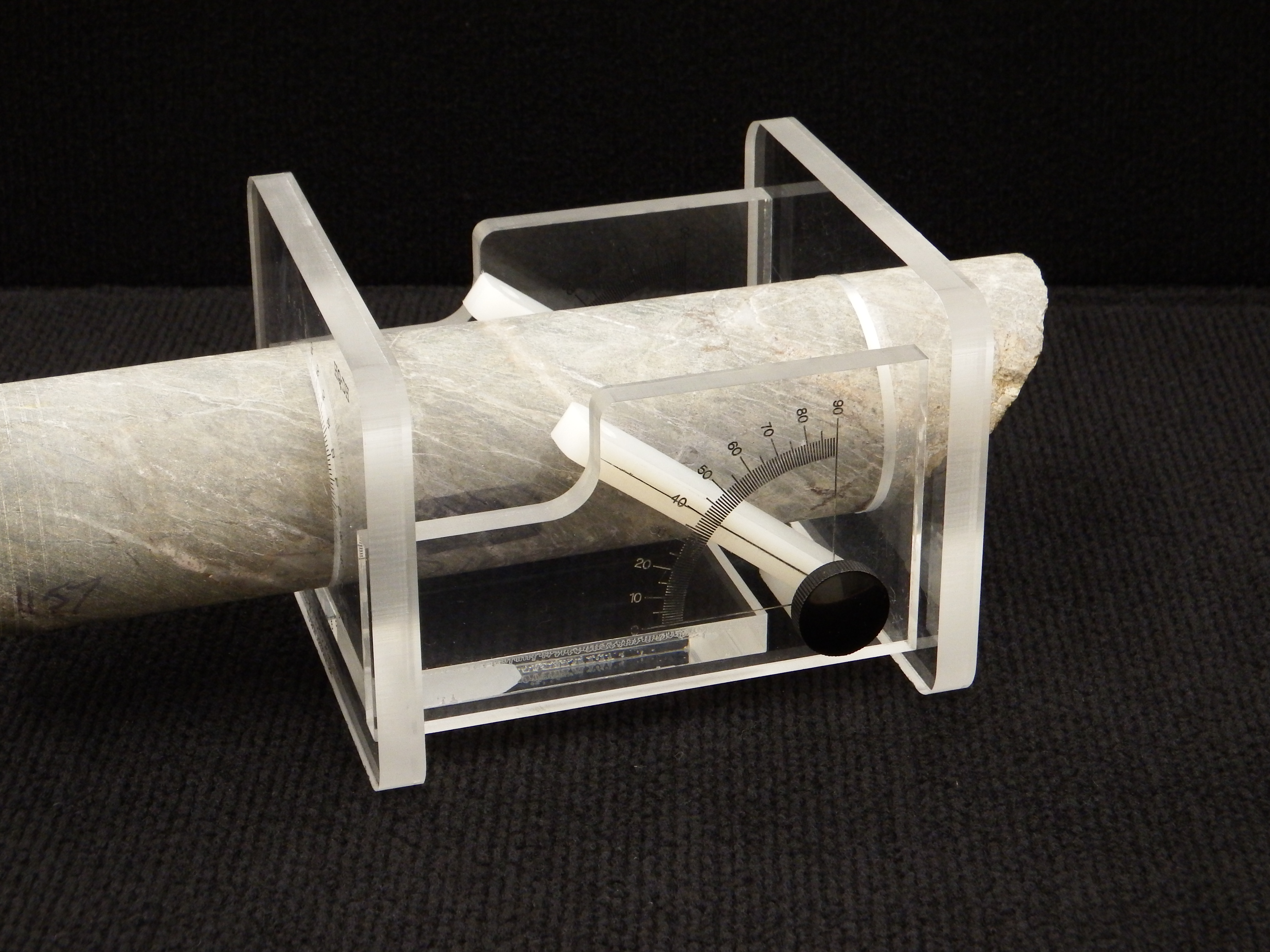
An oriented core goniometer, commonly used when analyzing cores for contacts and other structural features

Before the start of World War Two, John Branner Newsom, a California mining engineer, invented and patented a core drill that could take out large diameter cores (>5 ft.) up to 10 feet in length for mining shafts. This type of shaft-sinking drill is no longer in use as it was cumbersome, prone to jamming with cuttings, thus slow compared to conventional shaft sinking techniques, and only worked effectively in soft rock formations. Modern shaft-sinking technology accomplishes the same faster and at a much cheaper cost.

Core drills come with several power choices including electric, pneumatic, and hydraulic (all of which require power sources, such as a generator).

== Wireline core drilling ==
Wireline core drilling is a technique used to extract the core without having to retrieve the entire drill string of rods, which generally only needs to be retracted when the hole is finished or the drill bit must be replaced. Drill rod extensions are added at the top as required to extend the string as the hole gets deeper. The core sample is carried by an inner tube locked in place in contact with the drilling head, To recover the core, the drive system is disconnected, opening the top of the uppermost drill rod. A tool called an overshot assembly is lowered at the end of a wire and pumped down the string with water pressure. When it reaches the sample tube, it locks onto the top, and using the retraction winch to apply tension to the wire unlocks the sample tube from the drill head and retracts it and the core sample within it to the open top end of the drill string, where it can be removed before returning the sample tube down the drill string to lock back onto the cutting head. This is particularly useful for drill holes more than 30 ft deep as otherwise the whole string of rods had to be removed to recover the core, then re-inserted to drill deeper, and repeated. Removing all the rods every 30 feet to recover the core was time consuming for deep holes required for mining and mineral exploration, some of which may be 1,000 ft deep or more. This method greatly reduced the time required to drill a hole, and thus its cost, which increased the use of drilling and decreased the use of shaft sinking as a means of mineral exploration. It is also quite useful if there is a high risk of the hole walls collapsing when the drill tube is retracted, so it is suitable for most soil types, and to depths of 1000 m. Several diameters are available.

== See also ==
- Annular cutter – Form of core drill (for metal drilling)
- Drilling fluid – Aid for drilling boreholes into the ground
- Drilling rig – Integrated system to drill wells
- Exploration diamond drilling – Technique of geological core drilling
