= Polar Bear (battery-electric locomotive) =

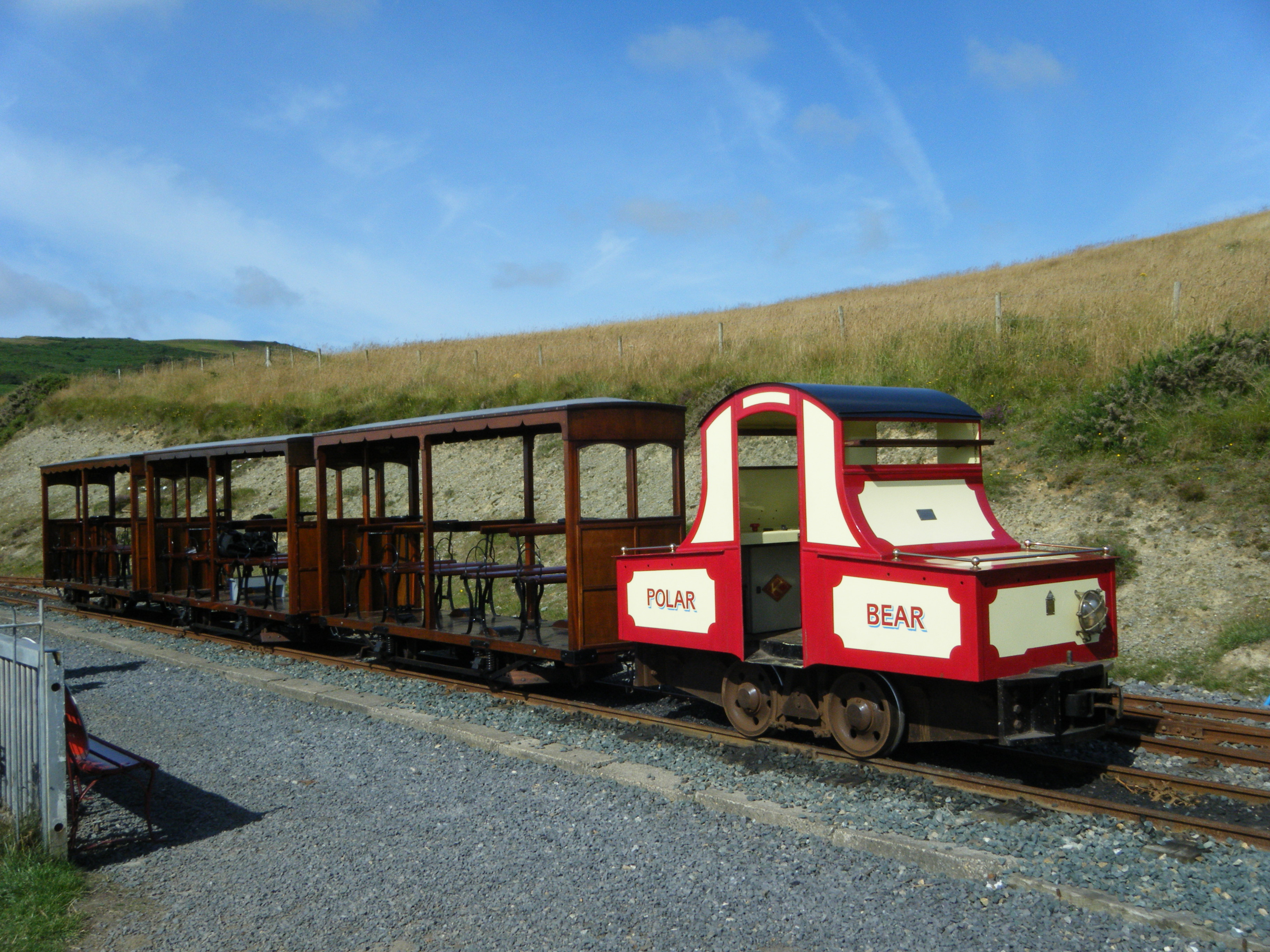
Polar Bear replica at Sea Lion Rocks station

Polar Bear was a 2 ft (610 mm) gauge battery-electric locomotive built by Wingrove & Rogers in 1921 as works no. 314 for the Groudle Glen Railway on the Isle of Man. Together with its sister, Sea Lion, they were intended to replace two Bagnall steam locos of the same names. The locos were not a success, and despite Polar Bear being rebuilt with bogies and a battery truck, the steam locos were reboilered and returned to traffic. Polar Bear was eventually scrapped in 1926.

== Replica ==
A replica loco was built by Alan Keef in 2003 for the rebuilt Groudle Glen Railway. It was built on the frame of a 1988-built vehicle of similar design (one of the last to be built) and has a newly fabricated body replicating that of two similar locomotives that operated the railway between 1921 and 1926. It has been built to represent Polar Bear in original form, and works engineering trains and occasional passenger services.
