= Gentle Annie Tramway =

Coordinates: 38°39′44″S 178°01′03″E

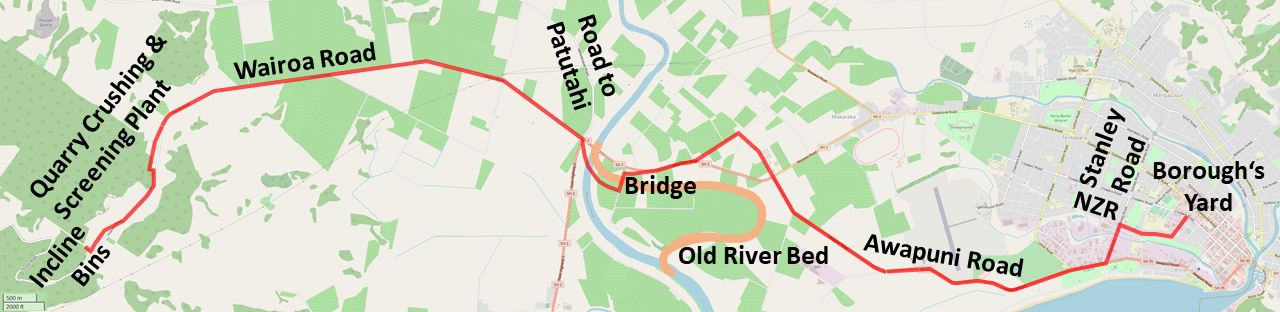

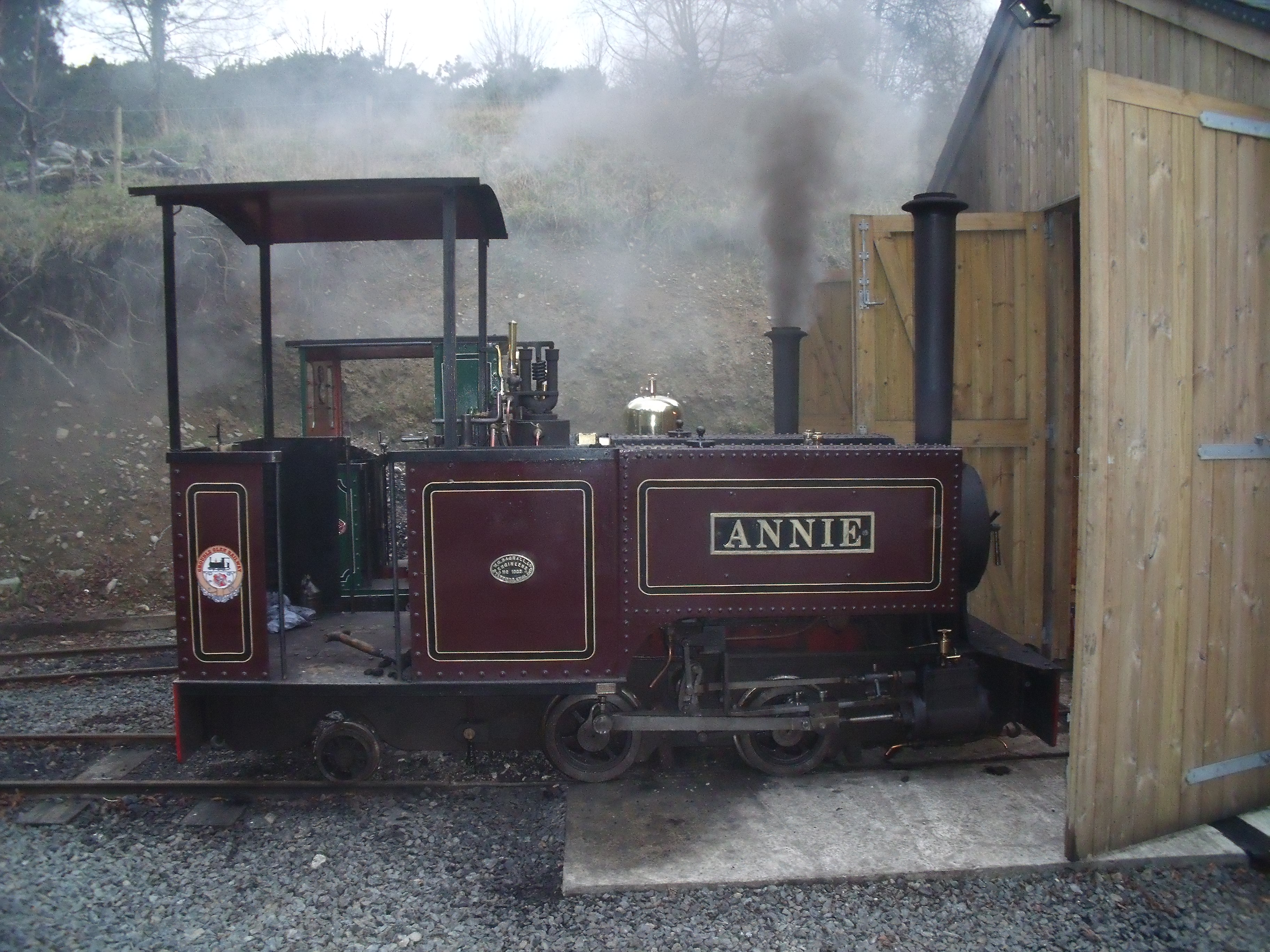
- Replica of "Annie" locomotive, Groudle Glen Railway, Isle of Man

Technical
- Line length: 19.3 km (12.0 mi)
- Track gauge: 2 ft 6 in (762 mm)

The Gentle Annie Tramway or Gisborne Borough Council’s Gentle Annie Metal Supply Tramway was a narrow gauge railway which formerly ran from Gisborne, New Zealand to the Gentle Annie quarry, a distance of 19.3 km (12.0 mi).

The tramway was built in 1911 by the Gisborne Borough Council to transport road metal to the Council depot in downtown Gisborne and also supply Cook County Council. The track was of 2 ft 6 in (762 mm) gauge and followed alongside the local roads. In September 1911 a further three-quarters of a mile of track extended the line from Stanley Road to the Council yard in Childers Road. The tramway closed in 1916 and all equipment was sold to Moutohora Stone Quarries, which had a short tramway from a nearby quarry to the Moutohora Branch terminus.

== Locomotives ==
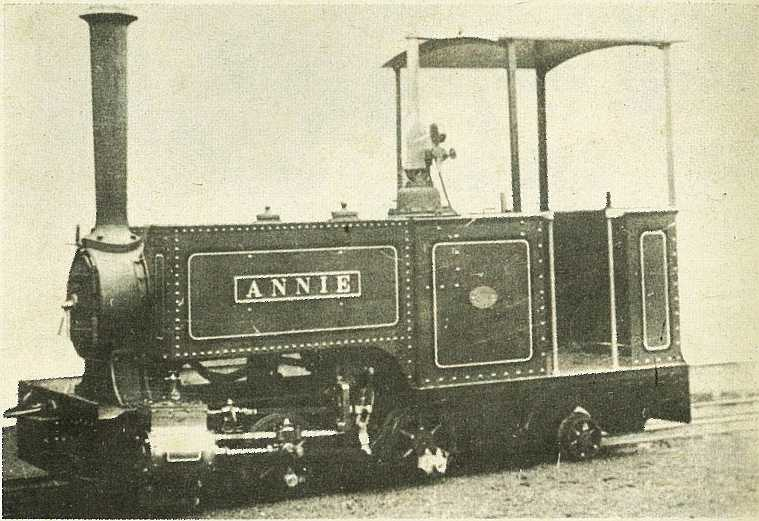
Steam locomotive "Annie" prior to leaving the works in England

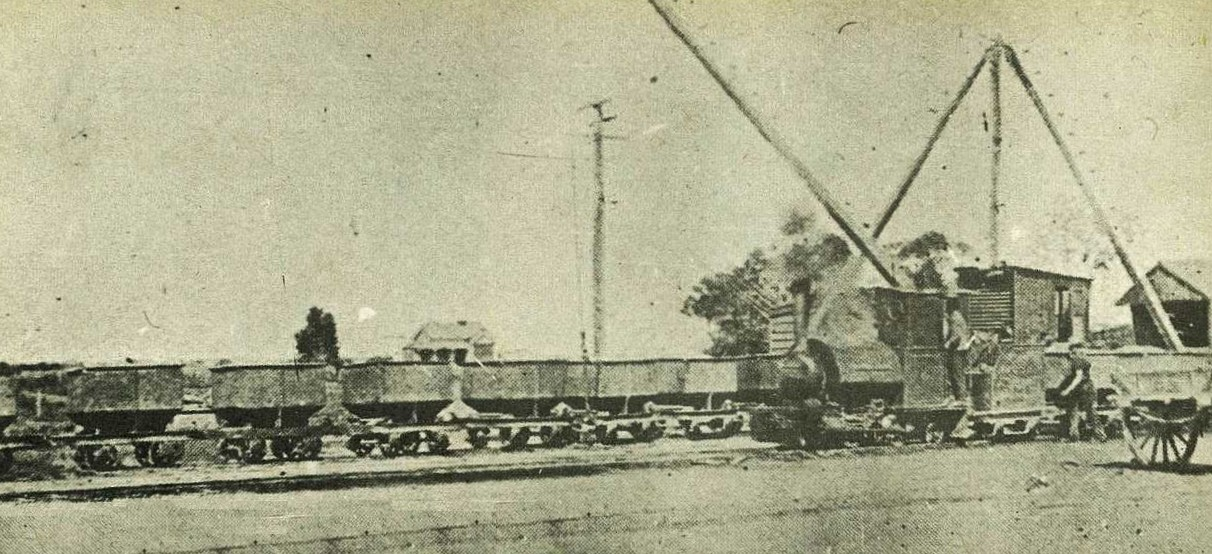
Steam locomotive "Jack" and a train of hoppers in the old council metal distribution centre

The tramway operated two W. G. Bagnall locomotives. "Jack", was works No. 1879 of 1911. It was originally 0-4-0ST, but was later modified with a trailing axle and tender to be a 0-4-2. "Jack" was delivered from the Bagnall Locomotive Works, England, on 26 January 1911. It had a weight of 5.25 tons and measured 11 ft 4 in (3.45 m) over the buffers. "Jack's" weight increased to 7 tons, when the tender was added by the council. "Annie", works No. 1922 also of 1911, was built a 0-4-2T side tank. "Annie" arrived from the Bagnall Works on the S.S."Squall" on 23 March 1912, and was stationed at the quarry end of the tramway. A replica locomotive operates at the Groudle Glen Railway on the Isle of Man, and another was built beforehand in Australia. Both locos worked at Moutohora Quarry until being laid up circa 1924. The whereabouts of "Jack" are unknown, but the frames of "Annie" have been preserved at the East Coast Museum of Technology, Makaraka. The tramway also used a Straker steam road waggon converted to rail use.
