= X-Y table =

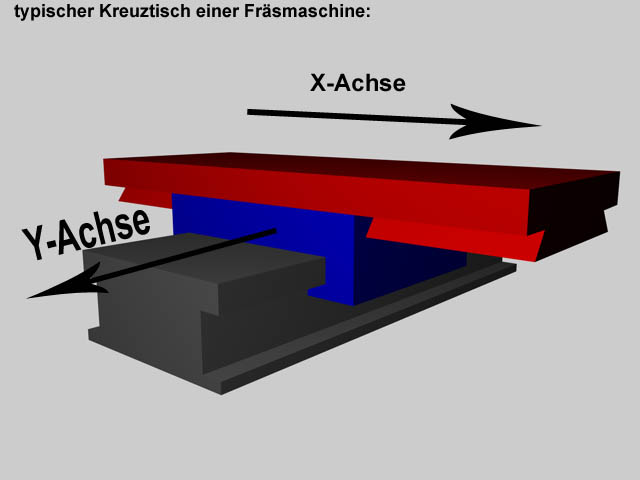
Figure illustrating a typical X-Y table for a milling machine.

X-Y tables, also known as cross working tables or coordinate tables, help provide horizontal motion for automated machinery such as assembly robots in manufacturing facilities. Robotic arms and other automated machinery have only a limited range of motion while their bases remain stationary; X-Y tables allow this basis to move horizontally along X and Y axis. Also known as XY stages, XY tables are motorized linear slides with linear motion based in bearings which are driven by a drive mechanism, typically a linear motor. XY tables are built and configured to provide high-performance positioning along multiple axes.

== Applications ==
Serving industries including general machinery, pharmaceutical, manufacturing and semiconductor, XY tables offer precision-controlled automated movement. XY tables are broadly used in mechanical processes and applications including material handling, industrial automation equipment, machinery building and automated measurement.

== Construction ==
XY tables are flat surfaces mounted on ball bearing slides or roller slides with multiple linear bases and are composed of forcers and platens. The forcer glides over the platen on frictionless air bearings and moves continuously in a linear motion across the platen. To create multiple axis, linear bases are often stacked on top of one another, with the top "Y" axis acting both as a carriage to the bottom base and as the base which holds the table. Adjustable gibs can be attached on both axis. These types of XY tables, used frequently for the movement of robotic, are often called "positioning tables". Materials used to construct XY tables include stainless steel and cast iron as well as bronze for bearings and aluminum for frames.

== Types ==
Variations among XY tables include the ways and the drive mechanism. The ways determine load capacity, straight-line accuracy, and stiffness, or durability, while the drive mechanisms determine smoothness and speed. In general, XY tables require very little maintenance, and are considered to be highly accurate, easy-to-use and lightweight. However, depending on the weight of the load, ball bearings within XY ball bearing tables and slides can acquire a significant amount of wear and may need to be replaced regularly.

== Gallery ==
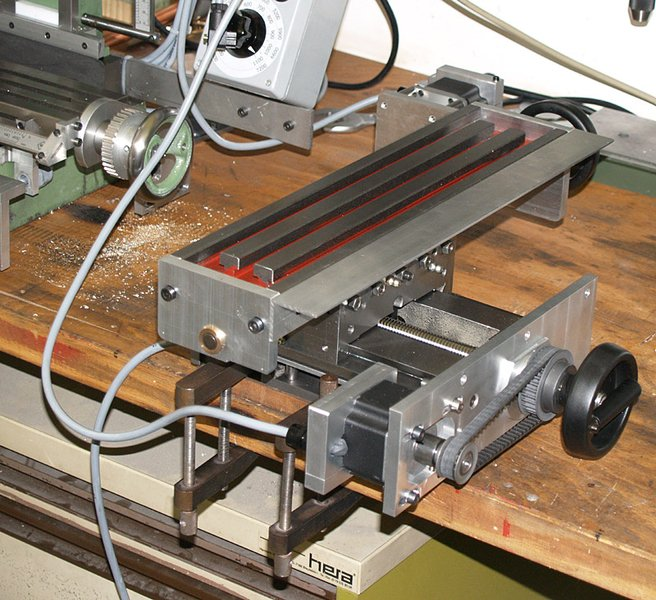
X-Y table for a CNC milling machine.

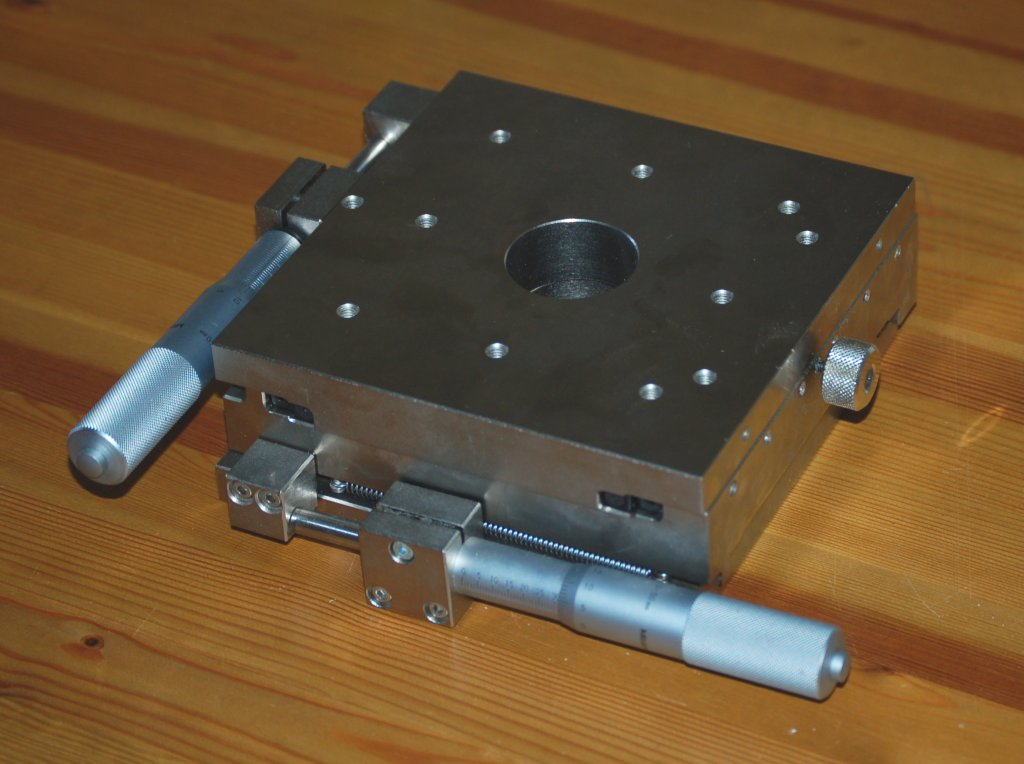
Precision XY table for a microscope.

A manual grinding machine with a crank controlled X-Y table.

== See also ==
- Linear-motion bearing
