= Sea Lion (steam locomotive) =

Coordinates: 54°10′39″N 4°25′19″W

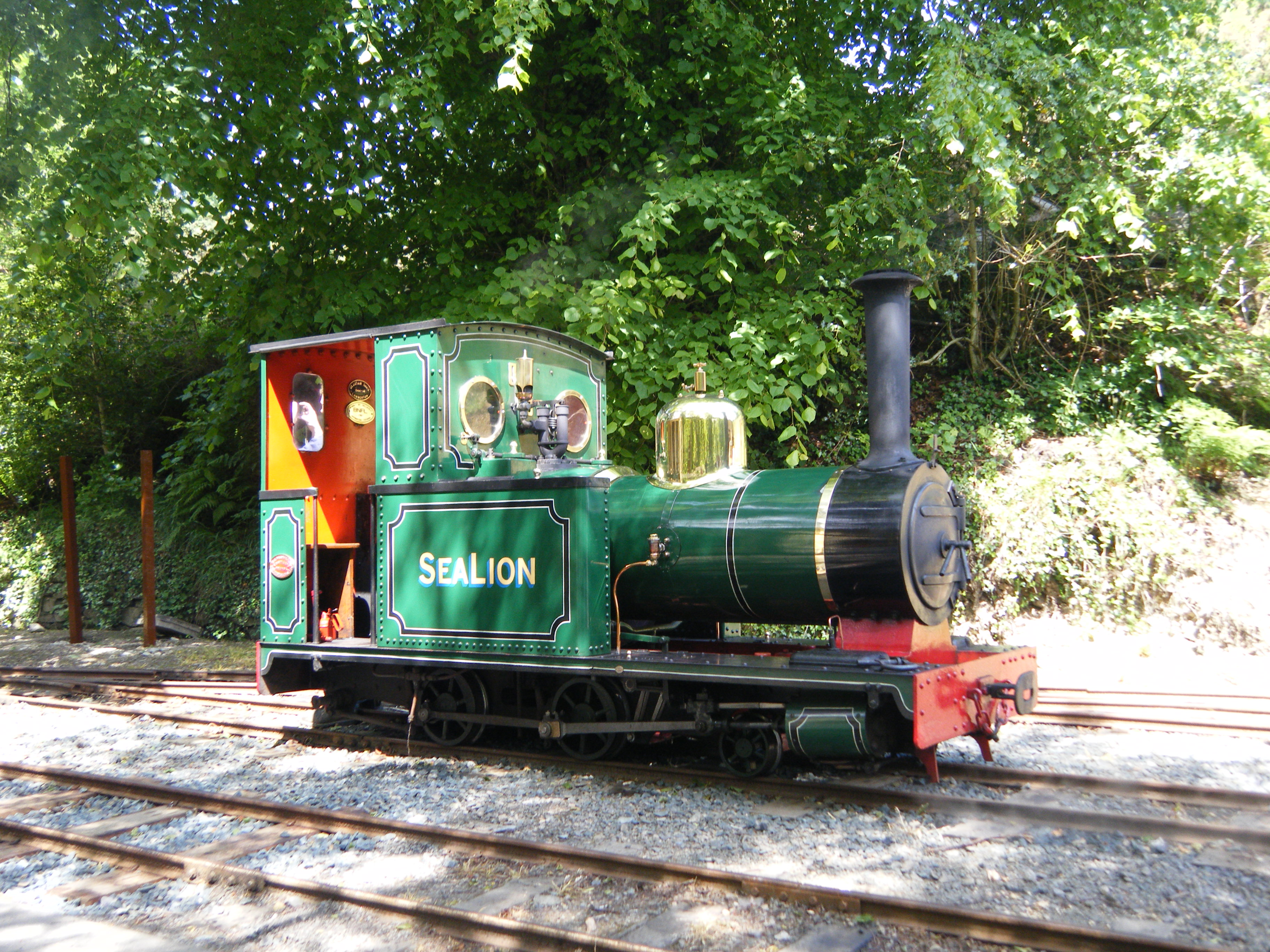
Type and origin
- Power type: Steam
- Designer: William Gordon Bagnall
- Builder: W.G. Bagnall & Co., Stafford
- Serial number: 1484
- Build date: 1896
Specifications
- Configuration
  - Whyte: 2-4-0T
- Boiler pressure: 160 psi (1,100 kPa) (originally 120 psi (830 kPa))
- Cylinders: Two
- Cylinder size: 4.5 in × 7.5 in (110 mm × 190 mm) (bore × stroke)
- Loco brake: Hand
- Train brakes: None
Performance figures
- Maximum speed: 15 mph (24 km/h)
- Tractive effort: 1,290 lbf (5.7 kN)
Career
- Operators: Groudle Glen Railway
- Withdrawn: 1939
- Restored: 1983–1987
- Disposition: Groudle Glen Railway

Sea Lion is a narrow-gauge steam locomotive built in 1896 for the Groudle Glen Railway on the Isle of Man.

== History ==
The locomotive was built by W. G. Bagnall & Co., Stafford and delivered in May 1896. It was the railway's only locomotive until it was joined in 1905 by sister locomotive Polar Bear. By the 1920 season the locomotive was deemed too costly for repair and the line purchased two battery electric locomotives that inherited their steam engine names. The modern engines proved to be financially disastrous and within a few years "Sea Lion" had been returned to the works for re-build. It continued to operate the line until closure at the outbreak of the Second World War in 1939.

When the line eventually re-opened in 1950 it was decided to operate with Polar Bear only owing to a decrease in demand and the poor condition of Sea Lion which had been stored in the open air for some time. The railway survived until 1962 but by this time Sea Lion was virtually derelict having had many of her brass components removed or stolen. She was saved from scrapping by local preservationist John Walton who transported her to his Steam Centre in Kirk Michael where the engine lay in the car park as an exhibit. When he moved to Loughborough he took the locomotive with him. When the project to restore the railway began, the remains of the locomotive were transported back to the island for restoration and ultimately operation on its original line and a campaign to have the engine restored was begun. The apprentices of British Nuclear Fuels however stepped in and the engine was taken to Sellafield in 1986 where the restoration was carried out.

By 1987 the engine had been transported to the nearby Ravenglass and Eskdale Railway where a section of 2 ft (610 mm) track was laid and the engine turned a wheel under its own steam for the first time since 1939. Thereafter it was returned to works for completion and painting before arriving at Groudle Glen that September to the delight of the railways' restorers, the Isle of Man Steam Railway Supporters' Association. The engine first performed passenger duties that Christmas, appearing in its original olive green colour scheme and entered service thereafter. Reboilering was completed in 2003 at which time the locomotive was repainted into the darker Brunswick green that it carried in the 1920s and it remains painted this way since then.

To honour one of the line's engineers, Alastair Lamberton, a plaque in his name was erected inside the cab in 1999, and the rebuild plates were also removed from the exterior as part of the reboilering, making for a more authentic appearance. Sea Lion carried a back lamp bracket between the cab windows which is inaccurate (although correct on Polar Bear) as it was originally on the waistband of the cab sheet.

Sea Lion visited the Ffestiniog Railway in 1997, and made a visit to Amberley Museum in 2005 to celebrate Polar Bear's centenary. This visit was immediately followed by a return visit of Polar Bear back to the GGR.

It was withdrawn from service following Christmas 2011 for her ten-year overhaul. Its boiler was taken to the Isle of Man Railway Workshops for re-tubing, with its frames and motion receiving attention at the Isle of Man Steam Packet Workshops on the island. It was re-assembled and back in service by July 2012 still in its 1920s livery. Following the end of the season it was stripped back to bare metal and received a full re-paint, reappearing at Christmas with a return to its 1896 livery with its name now appearing in gold leaf. The volunteers extensively researched to ensure this livery was accurate down to the shades of paint used and fine detail, including the early design of lined out green and black buffer beams which she now carries.

== Technical specification ==
When delivered, the locomotive carried an olive green livery with vermilion and yellow lining and the name carried on the side water tank in gold leaf with blue shadowing. Originally fitted with distinctive round cab windows back and front which were changed to rectangular ones early in the engine's career to improve driver visibility. A displacement lubricator was mounted on the brass dome. The locomotive had unusual valve gear patented by E.E. Baguley and is one of only four remaining locomotives with this; the others are Isabel at Amerton Railway, Rishra on the Leighton Buzzard Narrow Gauge Railway, and an unknown Bagnall locomotive on display in India.

== Bibliography ==
- Tony Beard (1999). Groudle Glen Railway: Its History & Restoration. Groudle Glen Railway.
- David Smith (1989). The Groudle Glen Railway. Plateway Press. ISBN 1-871980-00-X.
- I.o.M.S.R.S.A. (1966–2009). Manx Steam Railway News. I.o.M.S.R.S.A.

== See also ==
- Groudle Glen Railway fleet
- Isle of Man Steam Railway Supporters' Association
- Manx Electric Railway stations
- British narrow gauge railways
