= Forstner =

Forstner is a surname. Notable people with the surname include:

- Benjamin Forstner (1834–1897), an American gunsmith, inventor and dry-goods merchant
- Siegfried von Forstner (1910–1943), a German U-boat commander
- Thomas Forstner (b. 1969), Austrian singer
