= Drill bit =

Type of cutting tool

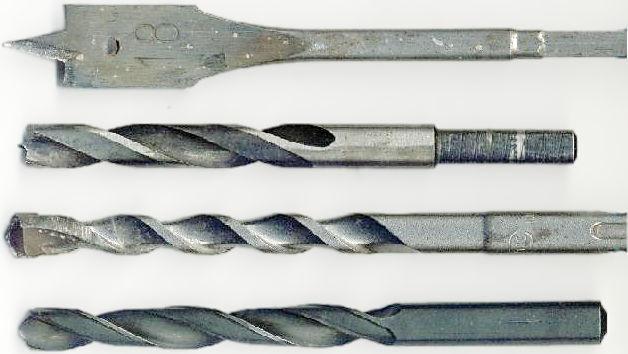
From top: Spade, brad point, masonry, and twist drills bits

Drill bit (upper left), mounted on a pistol-grip electric drill

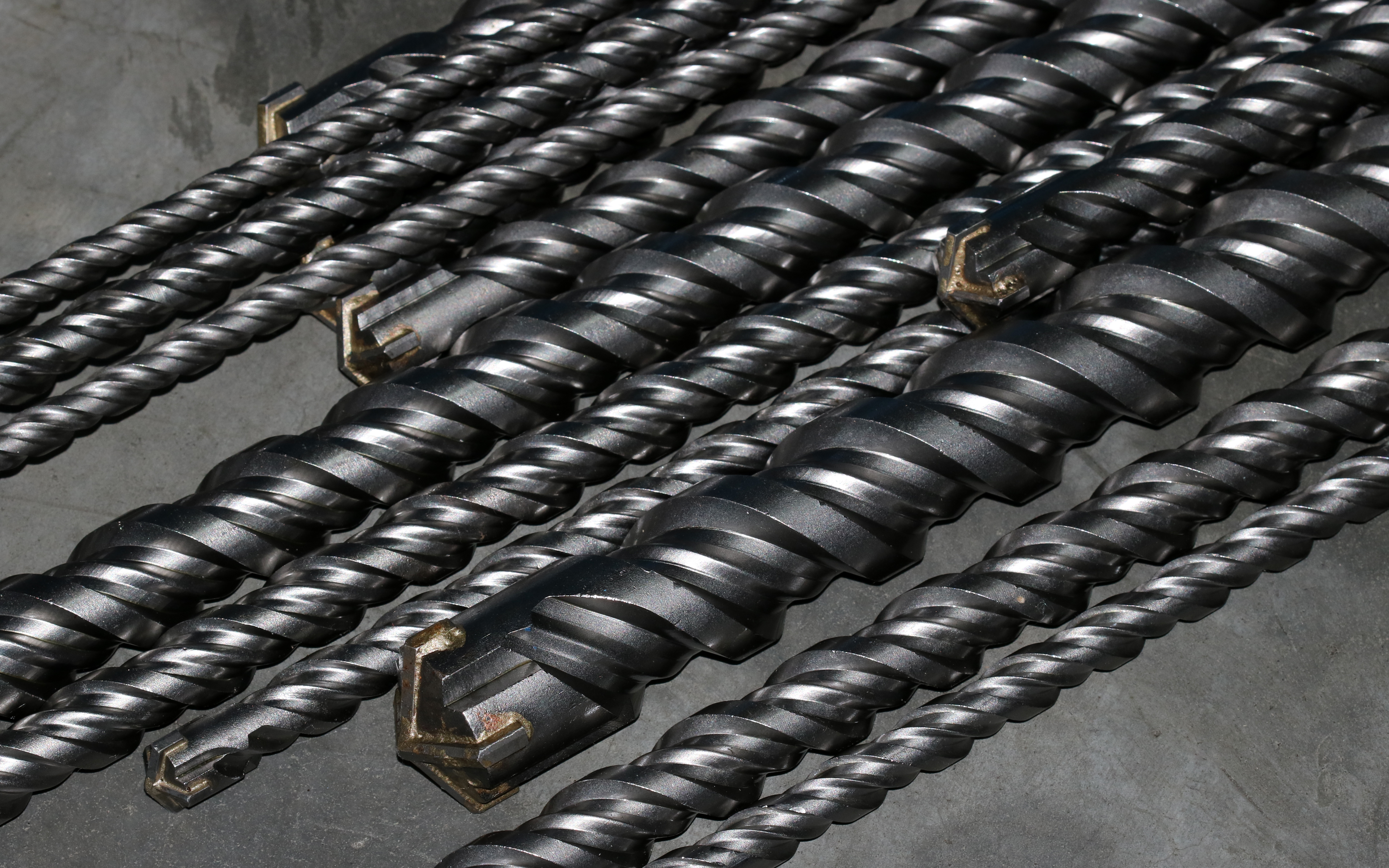
A set of masonry drills

A drill bit is a cutting tool used with a drill to remove material and create holes, typically with a circular cross-section. Drill bits are available in various sizes and shapes, designed to produce different types of holes in a wide range of materials. To function, drill bits are usually mounted in a drill, which provides the rotational force needed to cut into the workpiece. The drill will grasp the upper end of a bit called the shank in the chuck.

Drills come in standardized drill bit sizes. A comprehensive drill bit and tap size chart lists metric and imperial sized drills alongside the required screw tap sizes. There are also certain specialized drill bits that can create holes with a non-circular cross-section.

== Characteristics ==
Drill geometry has several characteristics:

- The spiral (or rate of twist) in the drill bit controls the rate of chip removal. A fast spiral (high twist rate or "compact flute") drill bit is used in high feed rate applications under low spindle speeds, where removal of a large volume of chips is required. Low spiral (low twist rate or "elongated flute") drill bits are used in cutting applications where high cutting speeds are traditionally used, and where the material has a tendency to gall on the bit or otherwise clog the hole, such as aluminum or copper.
- The point angle, or the angle formed at the tip of the bit, is determined by the material the bit will be operating in. Harder materials require a larger point angle, and softer materials require a sharper angle. The correct point angle for the hardness of the material influences wandering, chatter, hole shape, and wear rate.
- The lip angle is the angle between the face of the cut material and the flank of the lip, and determines the amount of support provided to the cutting edge. A greater lip angle will cause the bit to cut more aggressively under the same amount of point pressure as a bit with a smaller lip angle. Both conditions can cause binding, wear, and eventual catastrophic failure of the tool. The proper amount of lip clearance is determined by the point angle. A very acute point angle has more web surface area presented to the work at any one time, requiring an aggressive lip angle, where a flat bit is extremely sensitive to small changes in lip angle due to the small surface area supporting the cutting edges.
- The functional length of a bit determines how deep a hole can be drilled, and also determines the stiffness of the bit and accuracy of the resultant hole. While longer bits can drill deeper holes, they are more flexible meaning that the holes they drill may have an inaccurate location or wander from the intended axis. Twist drill bits are available in standard lengths, referred to as Stub-length or Screw-Machine-length (short), the extremely common Jobber-length (medium), and Taper-length or Long-Series (long).

The majority of drill bits intended for consumer use are designed with straight shanks. For heavy duty drilling in industry, bits with tapered shanks are sometimes used. Other types of shank used include hex-shaped, and various proprietary quick release systems.

The diameter-to-length ratio of the drill bit is usually between 1:1 and 1:10. Much higher ratios are possible (e.g., "aircraft-length" twist bits, pressured-oil gun drill bits, etc.), but the higher the ratio, the greater the technical challenge of producing good work.

The best geometry to use depends upon the properties of the material being drilled. The following table lists geometries recommended for some commonly drilled materials.

Tool geometry
Workpiece material	Point angle	Helix angle	Lip relief angle
Aluminum	90–135	32–48	12–26
Brass	90–118	0–20	12–26
Cast iron	90–118	24–32	7–20
Mild steel	118–135	24–32	7–24
Stainless steel	118–135	24–32	7–24
Plastics	60–90	0–20	12–26

=== Materials ===
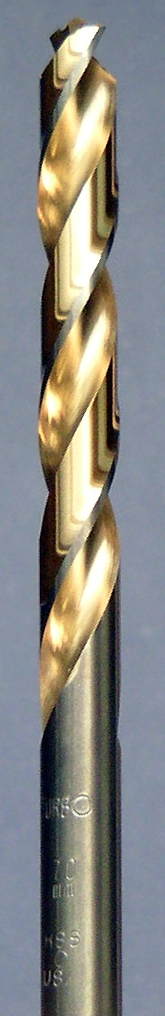
Titanium nitride coated twist bit

Many different materials are used for or on drill bits, depending on the required application. Many hard materials, such as carbides, are much more brittle than steel, and are far more subject to breaking, particularly if the drill is not held at a very constant angle to the workpiece; e.g., when hand-held.

==== Steels ====
- Soft low-carbon steel bits are inexpensive, but do not hold an edge well and require frequent sharpening. They are used only for drilling wood; even working with hardwoods rather than softwoods can noticeably shorten their lifespan.
- Bits made from high-carbon steel are more durable than low-carbon steel bits due to the properties conferred by hardening and tempering the material. If they are overheated (e.g., by frictional heating while drilling) they lose their temper, resulting in a soft cutting edge. These bits can be used on wood or metal.
- High-speed steel (HSS) is a form of tool steel; HSS bits are hard and much more resistant to heat than high-carbon steel. They can be used to drill metal, hardwood, and most other materials at greater cutting speeds than carbon-steel bits, and have largely replaced carbon steels.
- Cobalt steel alloys are variations on high-speed steel that contain more cobalt. They hold their hardness at much higher temperatures and are used to drill stainless steel and other hard materials. The main disadvantage of cobalt steels is that they are more brittle than standard HSS.

==== Others ====
- Tungsten carbide and other carbides are extremely hard and can drill virtually all materials, while holding an edge longer than other bits. The material is expensive and much more brittle than steels; consequently they are mainly used for drill-bit tips, small pieces of hard material fixed or brazed onto the tip of a bit made of less hard metal. However, it is becoming common in job shops to use solid carbide bits. In very small sizes it is difficult to fit carbide tips; in some industries, most notably printed circuit board manufacturing, requiring many holes with diameters less than 1 mm, solid carbide bits are used.
- Polycrystalline diamond (PCD) is among the hardest of all tool materials and is therefore extremely resistant to wear. It consists of a layer of diamond particles, typically about 0.5 mm (0.020 in) thick, bonded as a sintered mass to a tungsten-carbide support. Bits are fabricated using this material by either brazing small segments to the tip of the tool to form the cutting edges or by sintering PCD into a vein in the tungsten-carbide "nib". The nib can later be brazed to a carbide shaft; it can then be ground to complex geometries that would otherwise cause braze failure in the smaller "segments". PCD bits are typically used in the automotive, aerospace, and other industries to drill abrasive aluminum alloys, carbon-fiber reinforced plastics, and other abrasive materials, and in applications where machine downtime to replace or sharpen worn bits is exceptionally costly. PCD is not used on ferrous metals due to excess wear resulting from a reaction between the carbon in the PCD and the iron in the metal.

=== Coatings ===
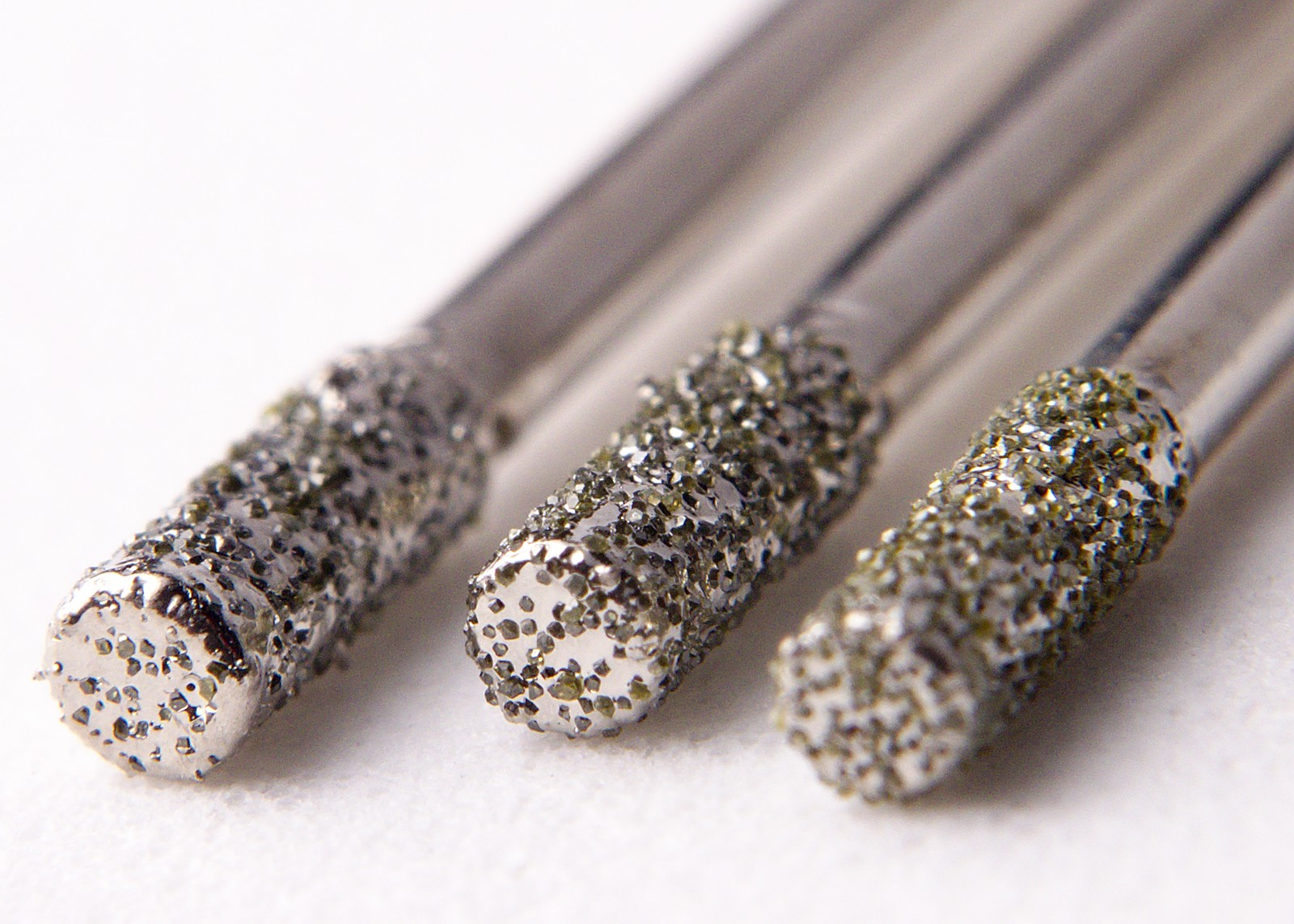
Diamond-coated 2 mm bits, used for drilling materials such as glass

- Black oxide is an inexpensive black coating. A black oxide coating provides heat resistance and lubricity, as well as corrosion resistance. The coating increases the life of high-speed steel bits.
- Titanium nitride (TiN) is a very hard metallic material that can be used to coat a high-speed steel bit (usually a twist bit), extending the cutting life by three or more times. Even after sharpening, the leading edge of coating still provides improved cutting and lifetime.
- Titanium aluminum nitride (TiAlN) is a similar coating that can extend tool life five or more times.
- Titanium carbon nitride (TiCN) is another coating also superior to TiN.
- Diamond powder is used as an abrasive, most often for cutting tile, stone, and other very hard materials. Large amounts of heat are generated by friction, and diamond-coated bits often have to be water-cooled to prevent damage to the bit or the workpiece.
- Zirconium nitride has been used as a drill-bit coating for some tools under the Craftsman brand name.
- Al-Chrome Silicon Nitride (AlCrSi/Ti)N is a multilayer coating made of alternating nanolayer, developed using chemical vapor deposition technique, is used in drilling carbon fiber reinforced polymer (CFRP) and CFRP-Ti stack. (AlCrSi/Ti)N is a superhard ceramic coating, which performs better than other coated and uncoated drill.
- BAM coating is Boron-Aluminum-Magnesium BAlMgB14 is a superhard ceramic coating also used in composite drilling.

== Universal bits ==
General-purpose drill bits can be used in wood, metal, plastic, and most other materials.

=== Twist drill bit ===
The twist drill bit is the type produced in largest quantity today. It comprises a cutting point at the tip of a cylindrical shaft with helical flutes; the flutes act as an Archimedean screw and lift swarf out of the hole.

The modern-style twist drill bit was invented by Sir Joseph Whitworth in 1860. They were later improved by Steven A. Morse of East Bridgewater, Massachusetts, who experimented with the pitch of the twist. The original method of manufacture was to cut two grooves in opposite sides of a round bar, then to twist the bar (giving the tool its name) to produce the helical flutes. Nowadays, the drill bit is usually made by rotating the bar while moving it past a grinding wheel to cut the flutes in the same manner as cutting helical gears.

Twist drill bits range in diameter from 0.002 to 3.5 in (0.051 to 88.900 mm) and can be as long as 25.5 in (650 mm).

The geometry and sharpening of the cutting edges is crucial to the performance of the bit. Small bits that become blunt are often discarded because sharpening them correctly is difficult and they are cheap to replace. For larger bits, special grinding jigs are available. A special tool grinder is available for sharpening or reshaping cutting surfaces on twist drill bits in order to optimize the bit for a particular material.

Manufacturers can produce special versions of the twist drill bit, varying the geometry and the materials used, to suit particular machinery and particular materials to be cut. Twist drill bits are available in the widest choice of tooling materials. However, even for industrial users, most holes are drilled with standard high-speed steel bits.

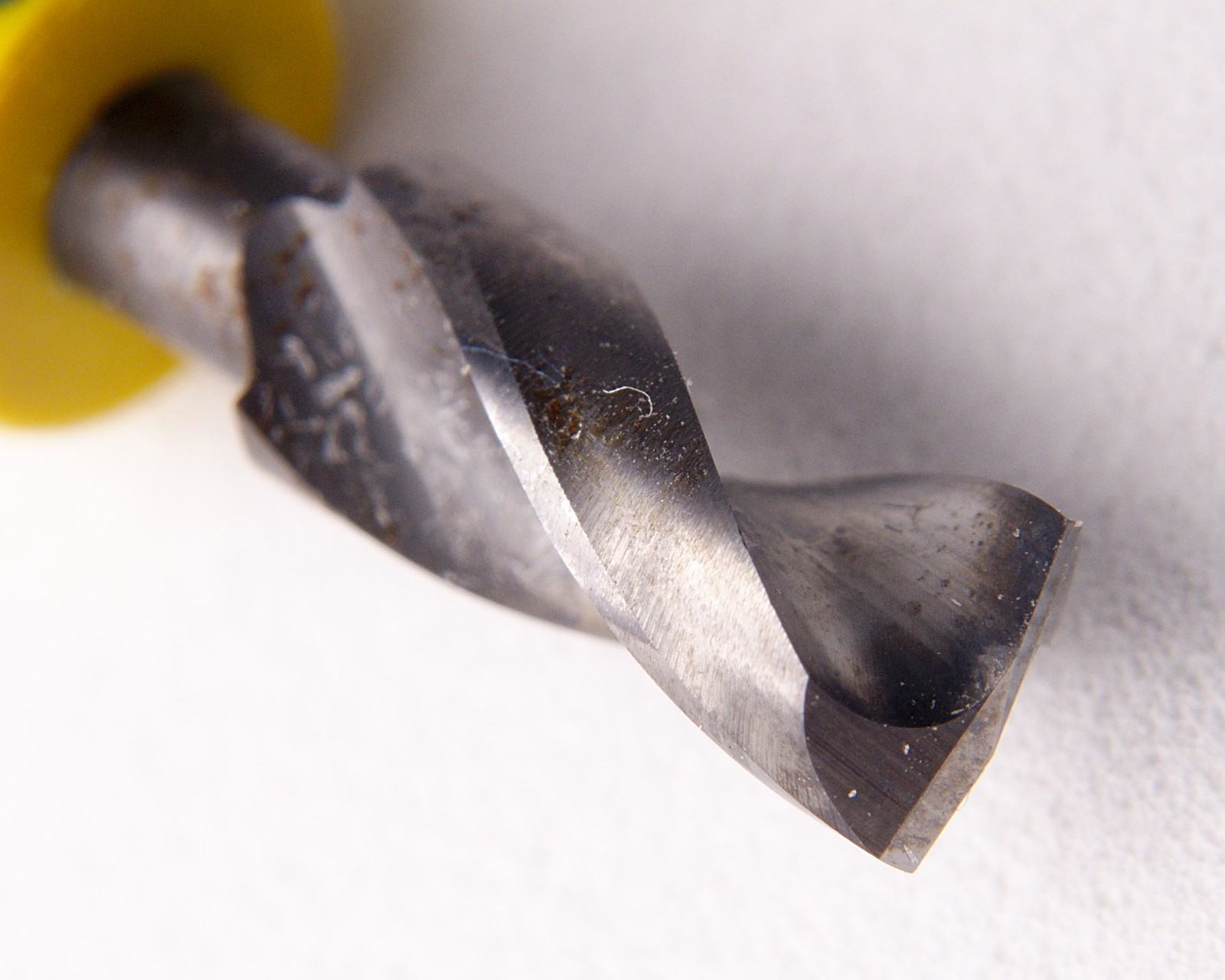
A 5 mm carbide bit displaying shallow point angle

The most common twist drill bit (sold in general hardware stores) has a point angle of 118 degrees, acceptable for use in wood, metal, plastic, and most other materials, although it does not perform as well as using the optimum angle for each material. In most materials it does not tend to wander or dig in.

A more aggressive angle, such as 90 degrees, is suited for very soft plastics and other materials; it would wear rapidly in hard materials. Such a bit is generally self-starting and can cut very quickly. A shallower angle, such as 150 degrees, is suited for drilling steels and other tougher materials. This style of bit requires a starter hole, but does not bind or suffer premature wear so long as a suitable feed rate is used.

Drill bits with no point angle are used in situations where a blind, flat-bottomed hole is required. These bits are very sensitive to changes in lip angle, and even a slight change can result in an inappropriately fast cutting drill bit that will suffer premature wear.

Long series drill bits are unusually long twist drill bits. However, they are not the best tool for routinely drilling deep holes, as they require frequent withdrawal to clear the flutes of swarf and to prevent breakage of the bit. Instead, gun drill (through coolant drill) bits are preferred for deep hole drilling.

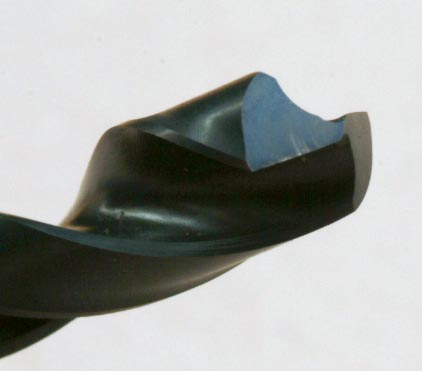
Twist drill bit cutting edges

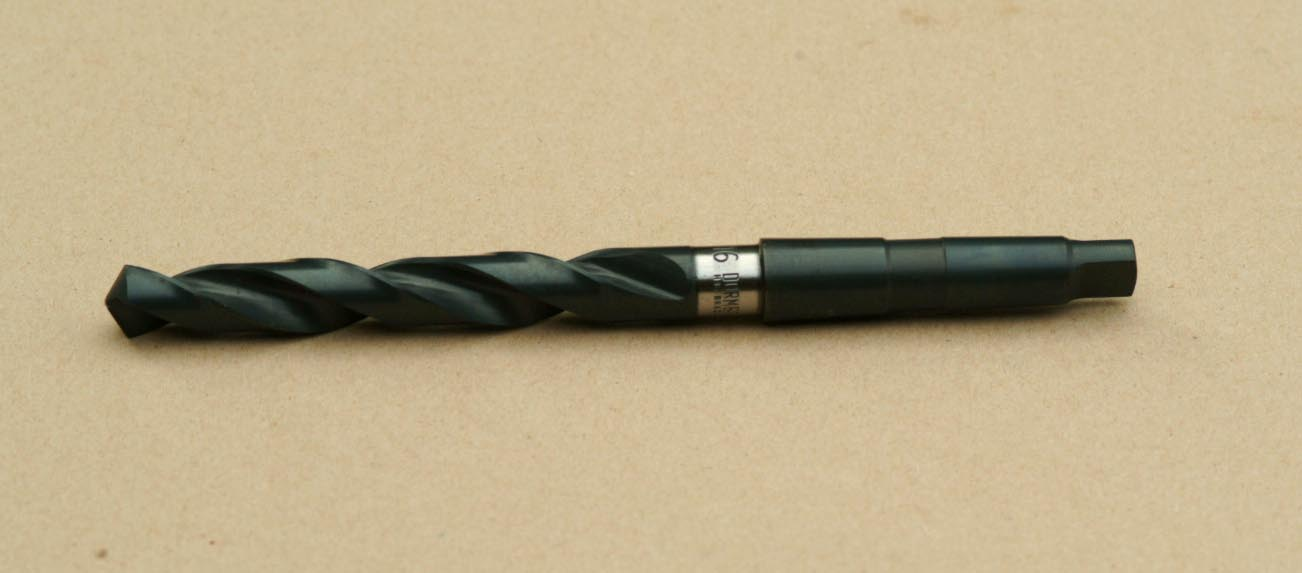
Twist drill bit with Morse taper shank

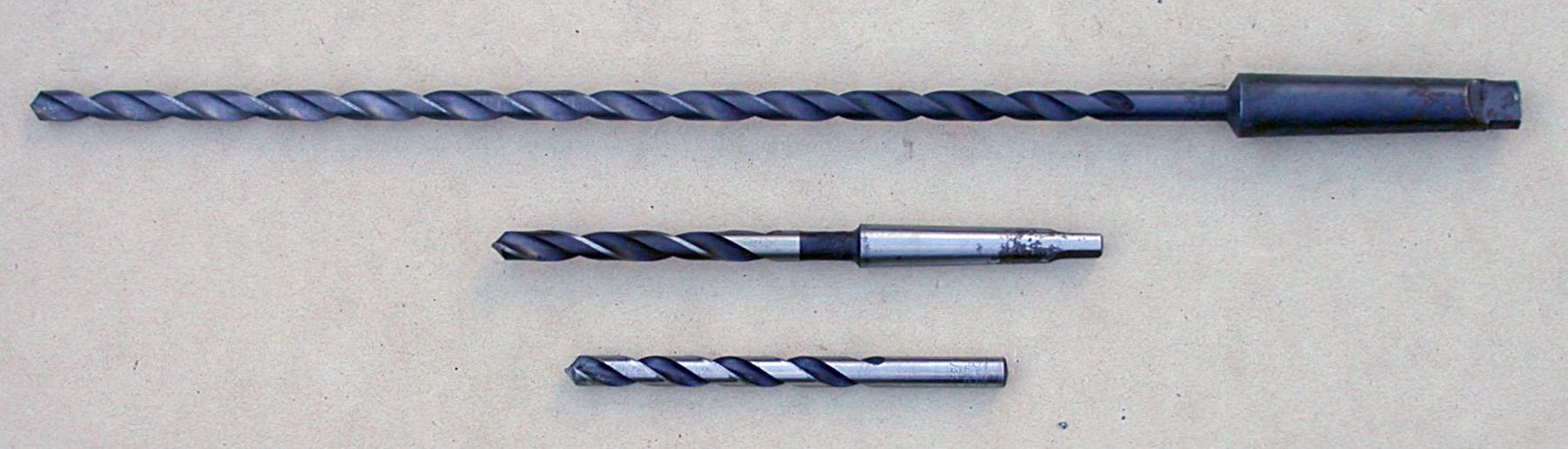
11/32 in (8.7313 mm) drill bits - long-series morse, plain morse, jobber

=== Step drill bit ===
A step drill bit is a drill bit that has the tip ground down to a different diameter. The transition between this ground diameter and the original diameter is either straight, to form a counterbore, or angled, to form a countersink. The advantage to this style is that both diameters have the same flute characteristics, which keeps the bit from clogging when drilling in softer materials, such as aluminum; in contrast, a drill bit with a slip-on collar does not have the same benefit. Most of these bits are custom-made for each application, which makes them more expensive.

=== Unibit ===
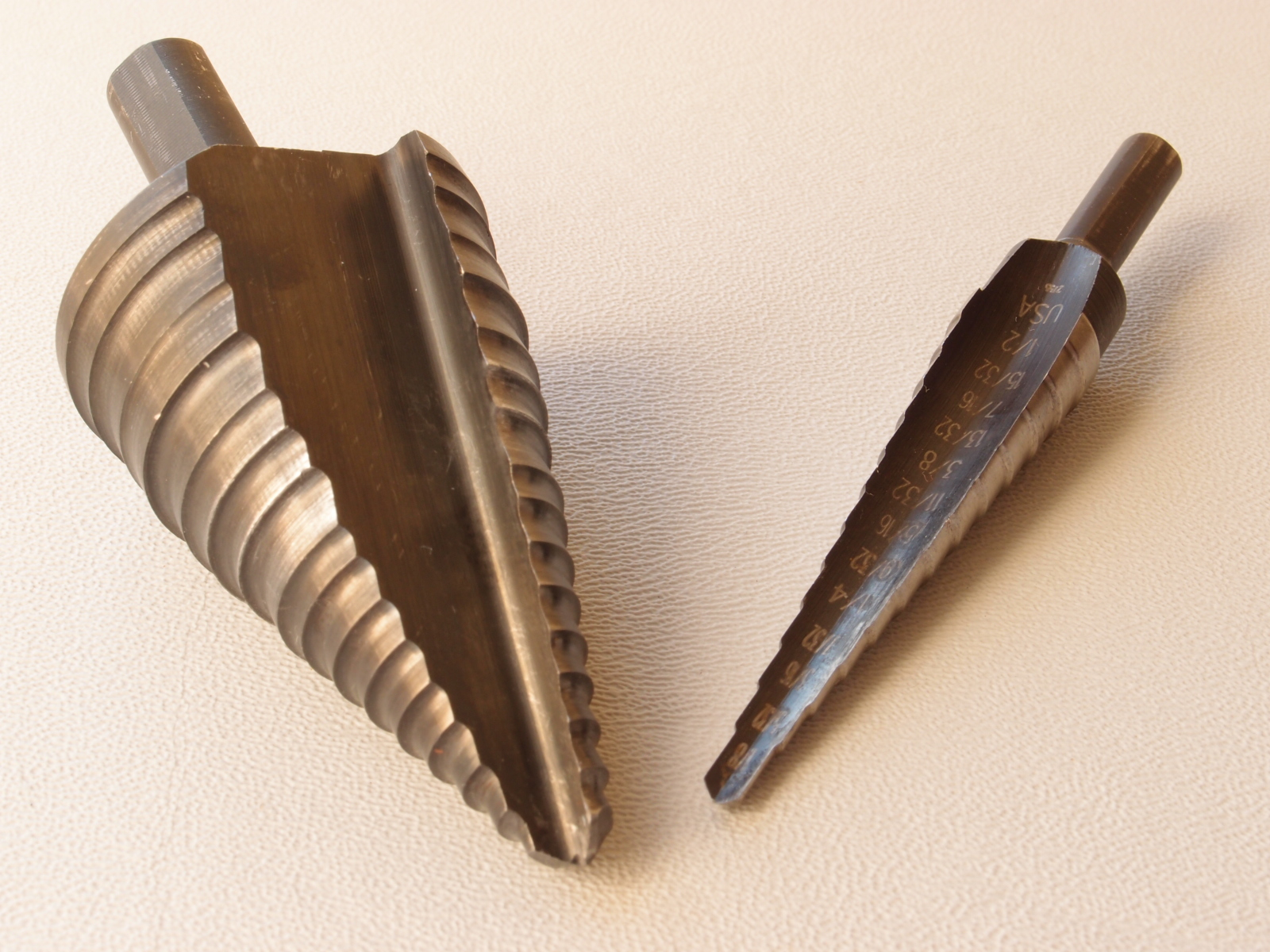
A pair of unibits

A unibit (often called a step drill bit) is a roughly conical bit with a stairstep profile. Due to its design, a single bit can be used for drilling a wide range of hole sizes. Some bits come to a point and are thus self-starting. The larger-size bits have blunt tips and are used for hole enlarging.

Unibits are commonly used on sheet metal and in general construction. One drill bit can drill the entire range of holes necessary on a countertop, speeding up installation of fixtures. They are often used on softer materials, such as plywood, particle board, drywall, acrylic, and laminate. They can be used on very thin sheet metal, but metals tend to cause premature bit wear and dulling.

Unibits are ideal for use in electrical work where thin steel, aluminum or plastic boxes and chassis are encountered. The short length of the unibit and ability to vary the diameter of the finished hole is an advantage in chassis or front panel work. The finished hole can often be made quite smooth and burr-free, especially in plastic.

An additional use of unibits is deburring holes left by other bits, as the sharp increase to the next step size allows the cutting edge to scrape burrs off the entry surface of the workpiece. However, the straight flute is poor at chip ejection, and can cause a burr to be formed on the exit side of the hole, more so than a spiral twist drill bit turning at high speed.

The unibit was invented by Harry C. Oakes and patented in 1973. It was sold only by the Unibit Corporation in the 1980s until the patent expired, and was later sold by other companies. Unibit is a trademark of Irwin Industrial Tools.

Although it is claimed that the stepped drill was invented by Harry C. Oakes it was in fact conceived by George Godbold and first produced by Bradley Engineering, Wandsworth, London in the 1960s and named the Bradrad. It was marketed under this name until the patent was sold to Halls Ltd.uk by whom it is still produced.

=== Hole saw ===
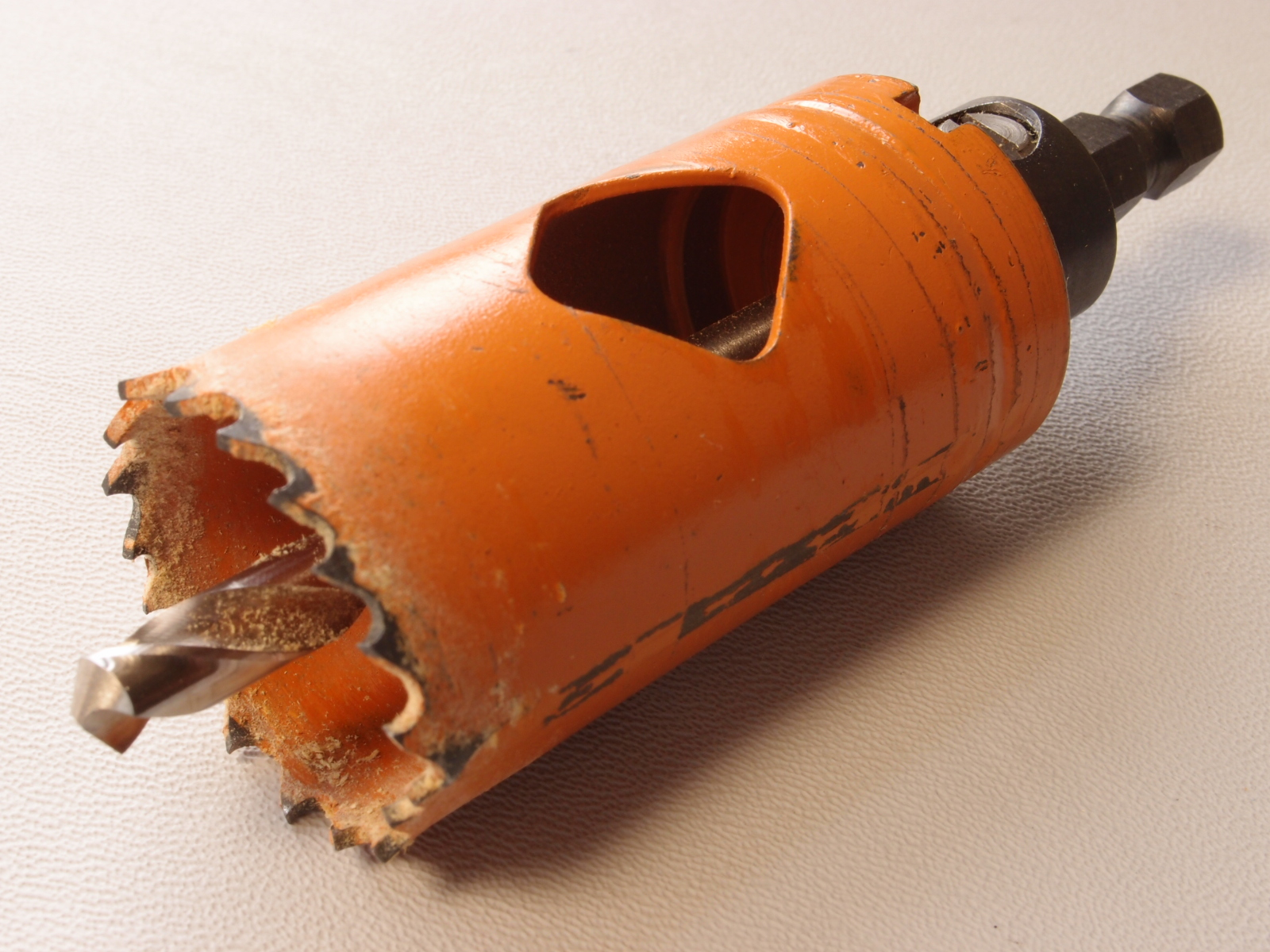
1.25 in (32 mm) hole saw bit

Hole saws take the form of a short open cylinder with saw-teeth on the open edge, used for making relatively large holes in thin material. They remove material only from the edge of the hole, cutting out an intact disc of material, unlike many drills which remove all material in the interior of the hole. They can be used to make large holes in wood, sheet metal and other materials.

== For metal ==
=== Center and spotting drill bit ===
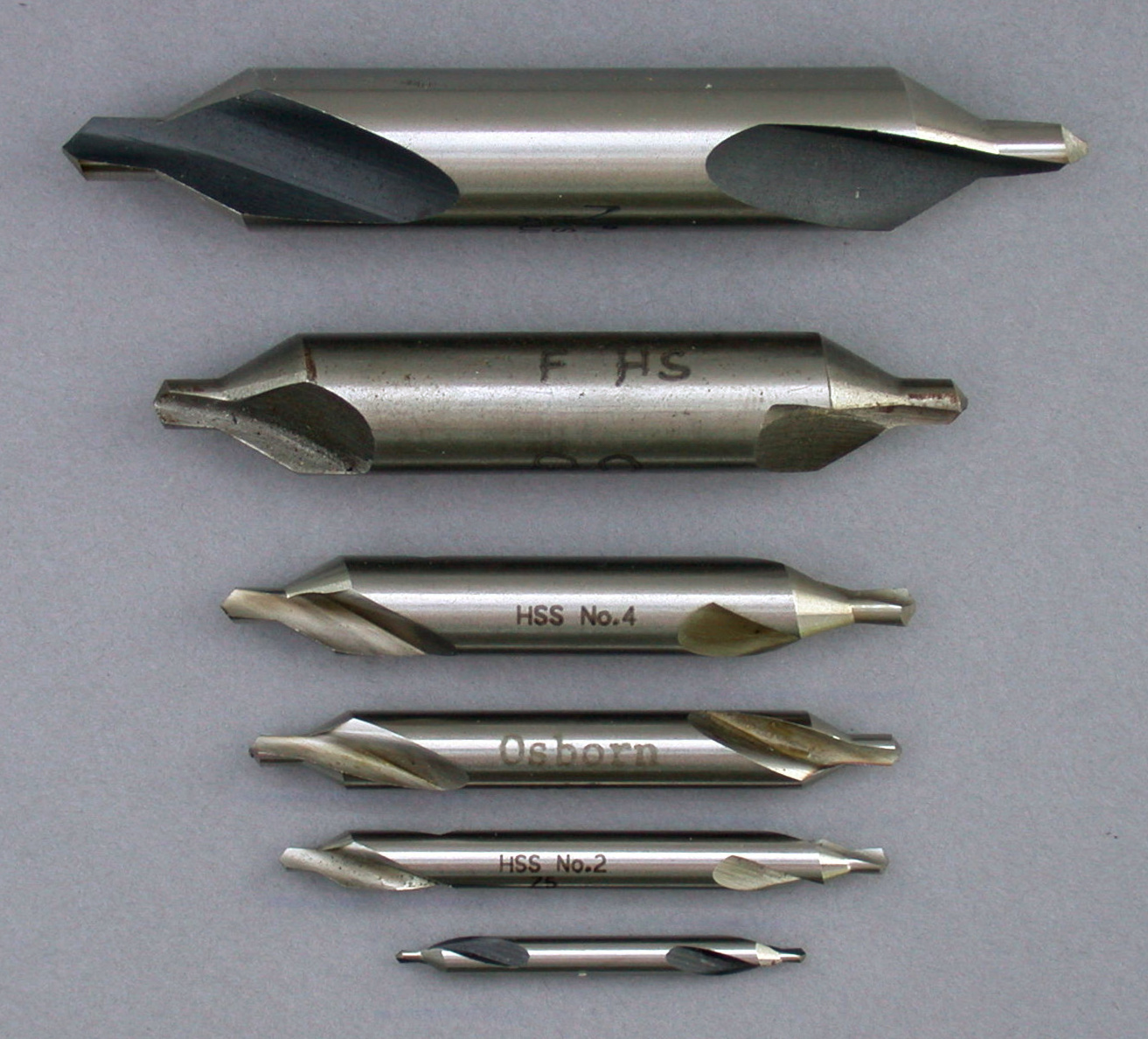
Center drill bits, numbers 1 to 6

Center drill bits, occasionally known as Slocombe drill bits, are used in metalworking to provide a starting hole for a larger-sized drill bit or to make a conical indentation in the end of a workpiece in which to mount a lathe center. In either use, the name seems appropriate, as the bit is either establishing the center of a hole or making a conical hole for a lathe center. However, the true purpose of a center drill bit is the latter task, while the former task is best done with a spotting drill bit (as explained in detail below). Nevertheless, because of the frequent lumping together of both the terminology and the tool use, suppliers may call center drill bits combined-drill-and-countersinks in order to make it unambiguously clear what product is being ordered. They are numbered from 00 to 10 (smallest to largest).

==== Use in making holes for lathe centers ====
Center drill bits are meant to create a conical hole for "between centers" manufacturing processes (typically lathe or cylindrical-grinder work). That is, they provide a location for a (live, dead, or driven) center to locate the part about an axis. A workpiece machined between centers can be safely removed from one process (perhaps turning in a lathe) and set up in a later process (perhaps a grinding operation) with a negligible loss in the co-axiality of features (usually total indicator reading (TIR) less than 0.002 in (0.05 mm); and TIR < 0.0001 in (0.003 mm) is held in cylindrical grinding operations, as long as conditions are correct).

==== Use in spotting hole centers ====
Traditional twist drill bits may tend to wander when started on an unprepared surface. Once a bit wanders off course it is difficult to bring it back on center. A center drill bit frequently provides a reasonable starting point as it is short and therefore has a reduced tendency to wander when drilling is started.

While the above is a common use of center drill bits, it is a technically incorrect practice and should not be considered for production use. The correct tool to start a traditionally drilled hole (a hole drilled by a high-speed steel (HSS) twist drill bit) is a spotting drill bit (or a spot drill bit, as they are referenced in the U.S.). The included angle of the spotting drill bit should be the same as, or greater than, the conventional drill bit so that the drill bit will then start without undue stress on the bit's corners, which would cause premature failure of the bit and a loss of hole quality.

Most modern solid-carbide bits should not be used in conjunction with a spot drill bit or a center drill bit, as solid-carbide bits are specifically designed to start their own hole. Usually, spot drilling will cause premature failure of the solid-carbide bit and a certain loss of hole quality. If it is deemed necessary to chamfer a hole with a spot or center drill bit when a solid-carbide drill bit is used, it is best practice to do so after the hole is drilled.

When drilling with a hand-held drill the flexibility of the bit is not the primary source of inaccuracy—it is the user's hands. Therefore, for such operations, a center punch is often used to spot the hole center prior to drilling a pilot hole.

=== Core drill bit ===
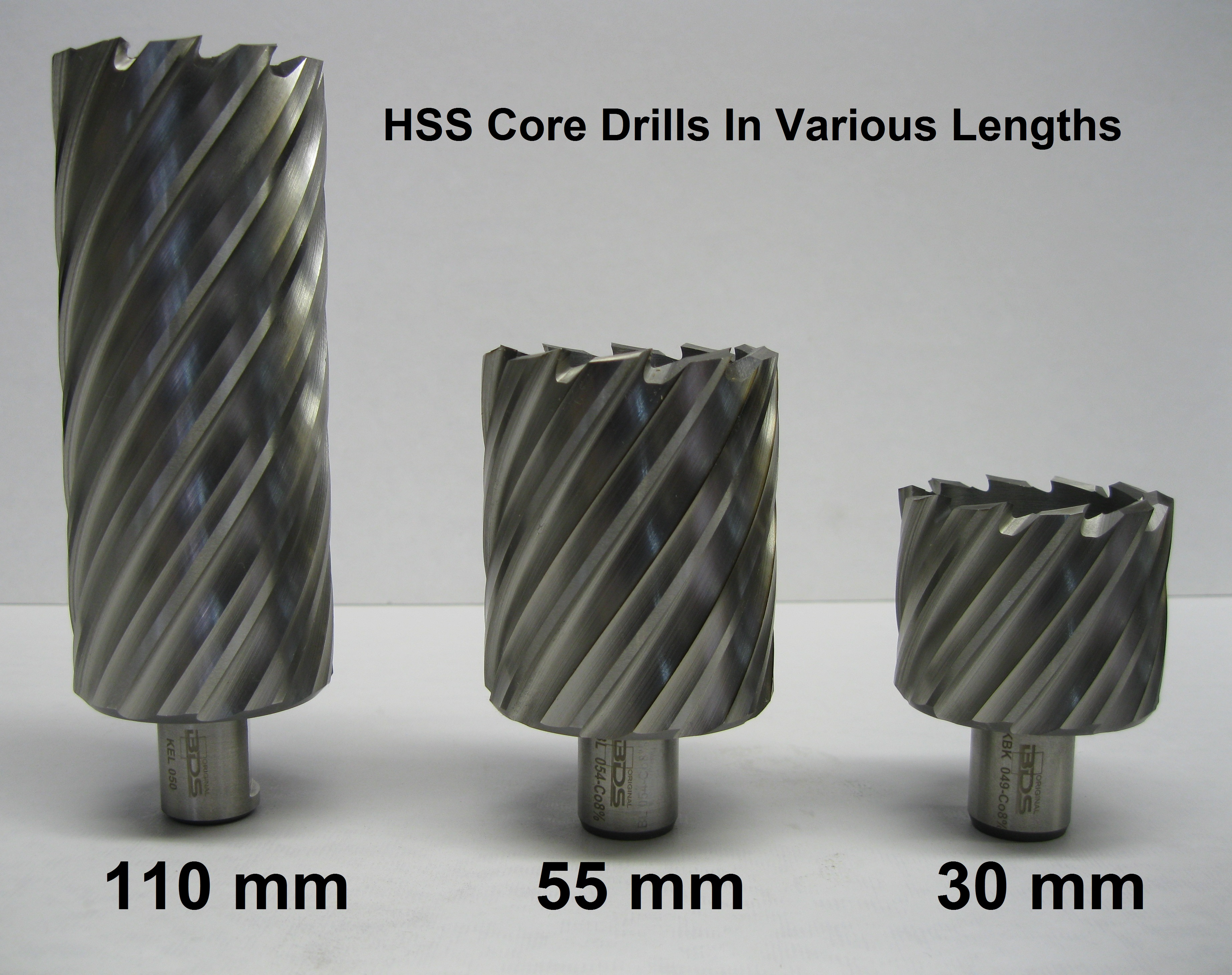
HSS core drills in various sizes

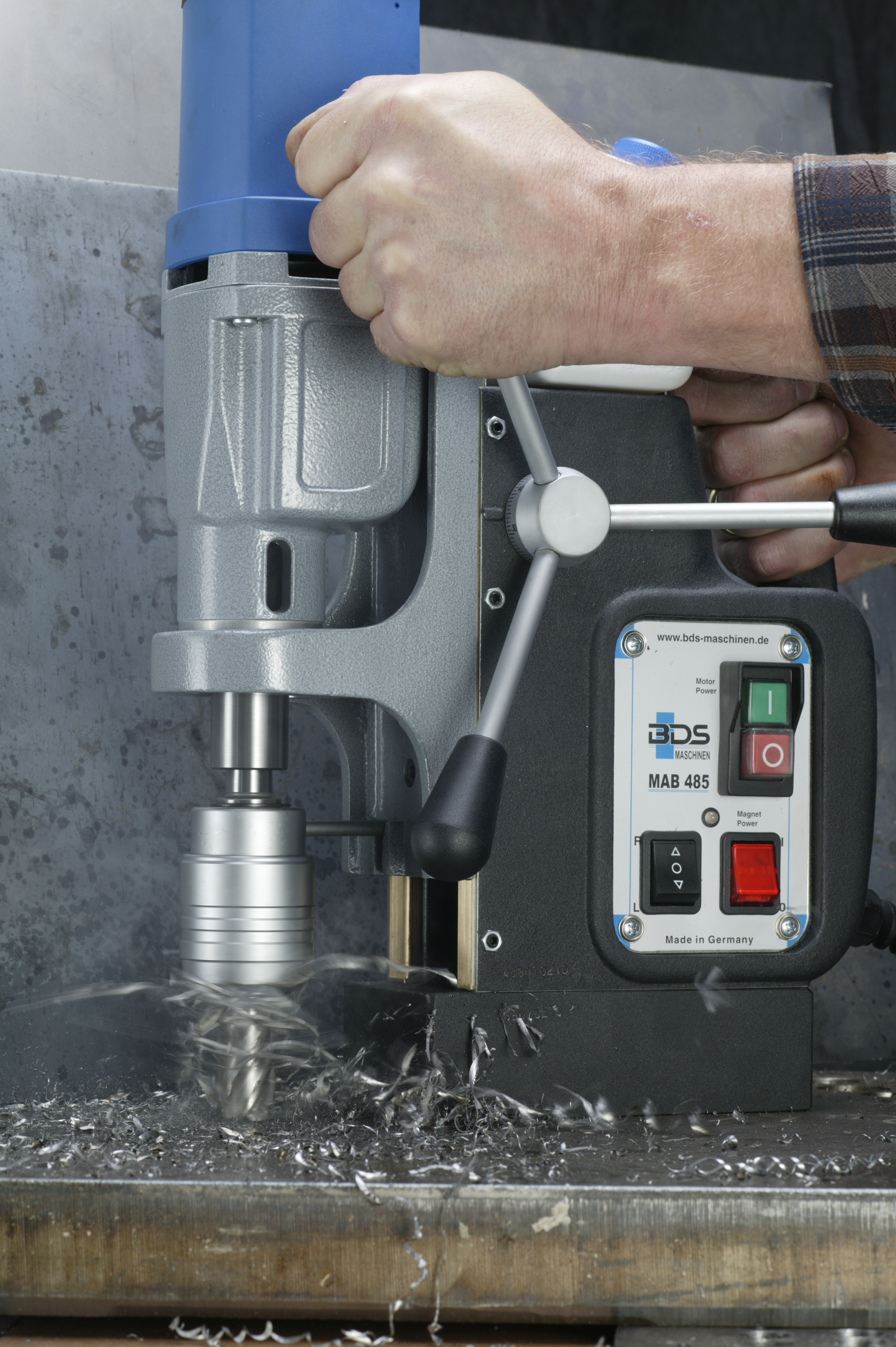
A magnetic core drilling machine making hole with annular cutter (core drill)

The term core drill bit is used for two quite different tools.

==== Enlarging holes ====
A bit used to enlarge an existing hole is called a core drill bit. The existing hole may be the result of a core from a casting or a stamped (punched) hole. The name comes from its first use, for drilling out the hole left by a foundry core, a cylinder placed in a mould for a casting that leaves an irregular hole in the product. This core drill bit is solid.

These core drill bits are similar in appearance to reamers as they have no cutting point or means of starting a hole. They have 3 or 4 flutes which enhances the finish of the hole and ensures the bit cuts evenly. Core drill bits differ from reamers in the amount of material they are intended to remove. A reamer is only intended to enlarge a hole a slight amount which, depending on the reamers size, may be anything from 0.1 millimeter to perhaps a millimeter. A core drill bit may be used to double the size of a hole.

Using an ordinary two-flute twist drill bit to enlarge the hole resulting from a casting core will not produce a clean result, the result will possibly be out of round, off center and generally of poor finish. The two fluted drill bit also has a tendency to grab on any protuberance (such as flash) which may occur in the product.

==== Extracting core ====
A hollow cylindrical bit which will cut a hole with an annular cross-section and leave the inner cylinder of material (the "core") intact, often removing it, is also called a core drill bit or annular cutter. Unlike other drills, the purpose is often to retrieve the core rather than simply to make a hole. A diamond core drill bit is intended to cut an annular hole in the workpiece. Large bits of similar shape are used for geological work, where a deep hole is drilled in sediment or ice and the drill bit, which now contains an intact core of the material drilled with a diameter of several centimeters, is retrieved to allow study of the strata.

=== Countersink bit ===
A countersink is a conical hole cut into a manufactured object; a countersink bit (sometimes called simply countersink) is the cutter used to cut such a hole. A common use is to allow the head of a bolt or screw, with a shape exactly matching the countersunk hole, to sit flush with or below the surface of the surrounding material. (By comparison, a counterbore makes a flat-bottomed hole that might be used with a hex-headed capscrew.) A countersink may also be used to remove the burr left from a drilling or tapping operation.

=== Ejector drill bit ===
Used almost exclusively for deep hole drilling of medium to large diameter holes (approximately 3/4–4 in or 19–102 mm diameter). An ejector drill bit uses a specially designed carbide cutter at the point. The bit body is essentially a tube within a tube. Flushing water travels down between the two tubes. Chip removal is back through the center of the bit.

=== Gun drill bit ===
Gun drills are straight fluted drills which allow cutting fluid (either compressed air or a suitable liquid) to be injected through the drill's hollow body to the cutting face.

=== Indexable drill bit ===
Indexable drill bits are primarily used in CNC and other high precision or production equipment, and are the most expensive type of drill bit, costing the most per diameter and length. Like indexable lathe tools and milling cutters, they use replaceable carbide or ceramic inserts as a cutting face to alleviate the need for a tool grinder. One insert is responsible for the outer radius of the cut, and another insert is responsible for the inner radius. The tool itself handles the point deformity, as it is a low-wear task. The bit is hardened and coated against wear far more than the average drill bit, as the shank is non-consumable. Almost all indexable drill bits have multiple coolant channels for prolonged tool life under heavy usage. They are also readily available in odd configurations, such as straight flute, fast spiral, multiflute, and a variety of cutting face geometries.

Typically indexable drill bits are used in holes that are no deeper than about 5 times the bit diameter. They are capable of quite high axial loads and cut very fast.

=== Left-hand bit ===
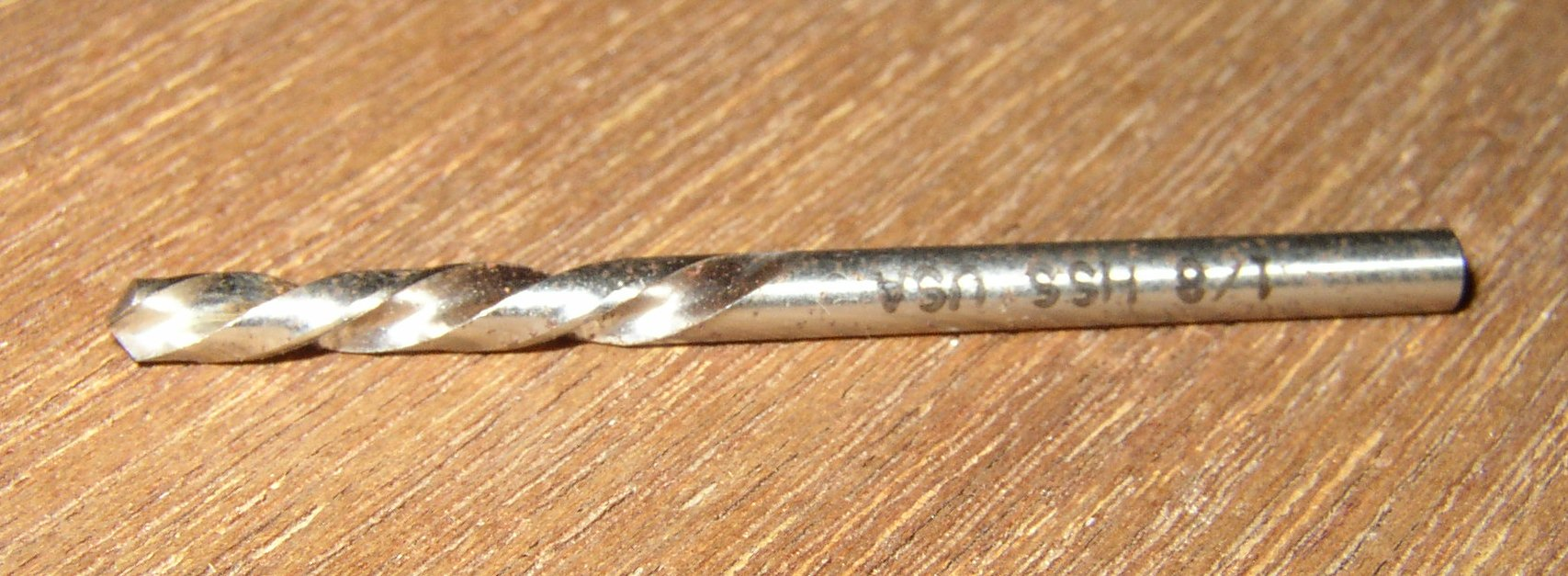
An 1/8-inch left-hand drill bit

Left-hand bits are almost always twist bits and are predominantly used in the repetition engineering industry on screw machines or drilling heads. Left-handed drill bits allow a machining operation to continue where either the spindle cannot be reversed or the design of the machine makes it more efficient to run left-handed. With the increased use of the more versatile CNC machines, their use is less common than when specialized machines were required for machining tasks.

Screw extractors are essentially left-hand bits of specialized shape, used to remove common right-hand screws whose heads are broken or too damaged to allow a screwdriver tip to engage, making use of a screwdriver impossible. The extractor is pressed against the damaged head and rotated counter-clockwise and will tend to jam in the damaged head and then turn the screw counter-clockwise, unscrewing it. For screws that break off deeper in the hole, an extractor set will often include left handed drill bits of the appropriate diameters so that grab holes can be drilled into the screws in a left handed direction, preventing further tightening of the broken piece.

=== Metal spade bit ===
A spade drill bit for metal is a two part bit with a tool holder and an insertable tip, called an insert. The inserts come in various sizes that range from 7/16 to 2.5 inches (11 to 64 mm). The tool holder usually has a coolant passage running through it. They are capable of cutting to a depth of about 10 times the bit diameter. This type of drill bit can also be used to make stepped holes.

=== Straight fluted bit ===
Straight fluted drill bits do not have a helical twist like twist drill bits do. They are used when drilling copper or brass because they have less of a tendency to "dig in" or grab the material.

=== Trepan ===
A trepan, sometimes called a BTA drill bit (after the Boring and Trepanning Association), is a drill bit that cuts an annulus and leaves a center core. Trepans usually have multiple carbide inserts and rely on water to cool the cutting tips and to flush chips out of the hole. Trepans are often used to cut large diameters and deep holes. Typical bit diameters are 6–14 in (150–360 mm) and hole depth from 12 in (300 mm) up to 71 feet (22 m).

== For wood ==
=== Brad point bit ===
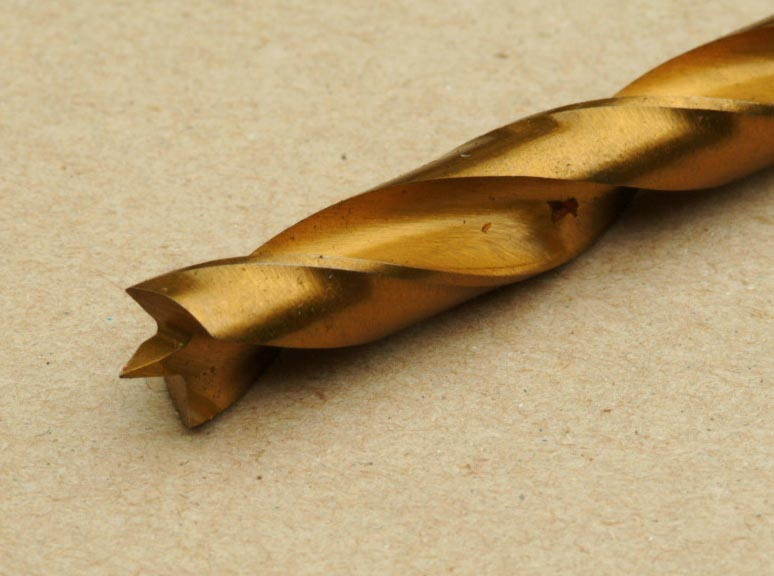
A 10.5 mm brad point drill bit

The brad point drill bit (also known as lip and spur drill bit, and dowel drill bit) is a variation of the twist drill bit which is optimized for drilling in wood.

Conventional twist drill bits tend to wander when presented to a flat workpiece. For metalwork, this is countered by drilling a pilot hole with a spotting drill bit. In wood, the brad point drill bit is another solution: the center of the drill bit is given not the straight chisel of the twist drill bit, but a spur with a sharp point, and four sharp corners to cut the wood. While drilling, the sharp point of the spur pushes into the soft wood to keep the drill bit in line.

Metals are typically isotropic, so even an ordinary twist drill bit will shear the edges of the hole cleanly. Wood drilled across the grain, however, produces long strands of wood fiber. These long strands tend to pull out of the hole, rather than being cleanly cut at the hole edge. The brad point drill bit has the outside corner of the cutting edges leading, so that it cuts the periphery of the hole before the inner parts of the cutting edges plane off the base of the hole. By cutting the periphery first, the lip maximizes the chance that the fibers can be cut cleanly, rather than having to be pulled messily from the timber.

Brad point drill bits are also effective in soft plastic. When using conventional twist drill bits in a handheld drill, where the drilling direction is not maintained perfectly throughout the operation, there is a tendency for hole edges to be "smeared" due to side friction and heat.

In metal, the brad point drill bit is confined to drilling only the thinnest and softest sheet metals, ideally with a drill press. The bits have an extremely fast cutting tool geometry: no point angle, combined with a large (considering the flat cutting edge) lip angle, causes the edges to take a very aggressive cut with relatively little point pressure. This means these bits tend to bind in metal; given a workpiece of sufficient thinness, they have a tendency to punch through and leave the bit's cross-sectional geometry behind.

Brad point drill bits are ordinarily available in diameters from 3–16 mm (0.12–0.63 in).

=== Wood spade bit ===
Spade bits are used for rough boring in wood. They tend to cause splintering when they emerge from the workpiece. Woodworkers avoid splintering by finishing the hole from the opposite side of the work. Spade bits are flat, with a centering point and two cutters. The cutters are often equipped with spurs in an attempt to ensure a cleaner hole. With their small shank diameters relative to their boring diameters, spade bit shanks often have flats forged or ground into them to prevent slipping in drill chucks. Some bits are equipped with long shanks and have a small hole drilled through the flat part, allowing them to be used much like a bell-hanger bit. Intended for high speed use, they are used with electric hand drills. Spade bits are also sometimes referred to as "paddle bits".

Spade drill bits are ordinarily available in diameters from 6 to 36 mm, or 1/4 to 1 1/2 inches.

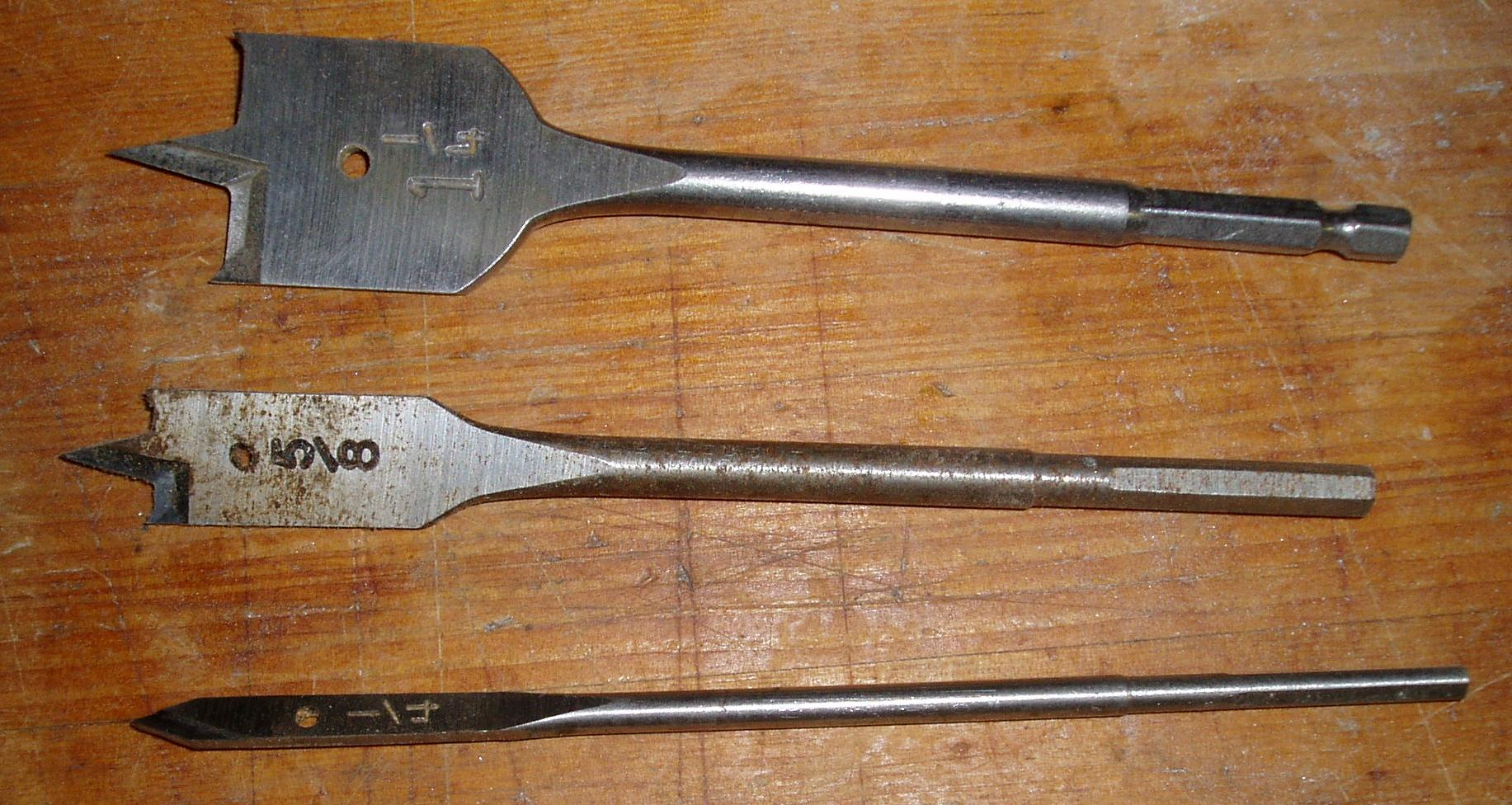
Spade bits

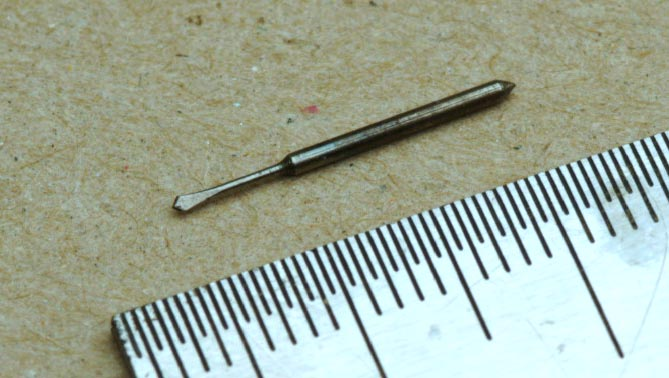
Tiny spade bit

=== Spoon bit ===
Spoon bits consist of a grooved shank with a point shaped somewhat like the bowl of a spoon, with the cutting edge on the end. The more common type is like a gouge bit that ends in a slight point. This is helpful for starting the hole, as it has a center that will not wander or walk. These bits are used by chair-makers for boring or reaming holes in the seats and arms of chairs. Their design is ancient, going back to Roman times. Spoon bits have even been found in Viking excavations. Modern spoon bits are made of hand-forged carbon steel, carefully heat-treated and then hand ground to a fine edge.

Spoon bits are the traditional boring tools used with a brace. They should never be used with a power drill of any kind. Their key advantage over regular brace bits and power drill bits is that the angle of the hole can be adjusted. This is very important in chairmaking, because all the angles are usually eyeballed. Another advantage is that they do not have a lead screw, so they can be drilled successfully in a chair leg without having the lead screw peek out the other side.

When reaming a pre-bored straight-sided hole, the spoon bit is inserted into the hole and rotated in a clockwise direction with a carpenters' brace until the desired taper is achieved. When boring into solid wood, the bit should be started in the vertical position; after a "dish" has been created and the bit has begun to "bite" into the wood, the angle of boring can be changed by tilting the brace a bit out of the vertical. Holes can be drilled precisely, cleanly and quickly in any wood, at any angle of incidence, with total control of direction and the ability to change that direction at will.

Parallel spoon bits are used primarily for boring holes in the seat of a Windsor chair to take the back spindles, or similar round-tenon work when assembling furniture frames in green woodworking work.

The spoon bit may be honed by using a slipstone on the inside of the cutting edge; the outside edge should never be touched.

=== Forstner bit ===
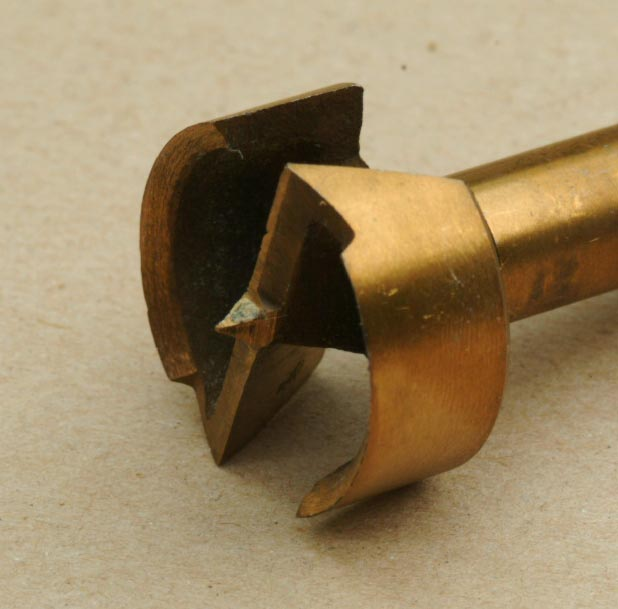
25 mm (1.0 in) Forstner bit

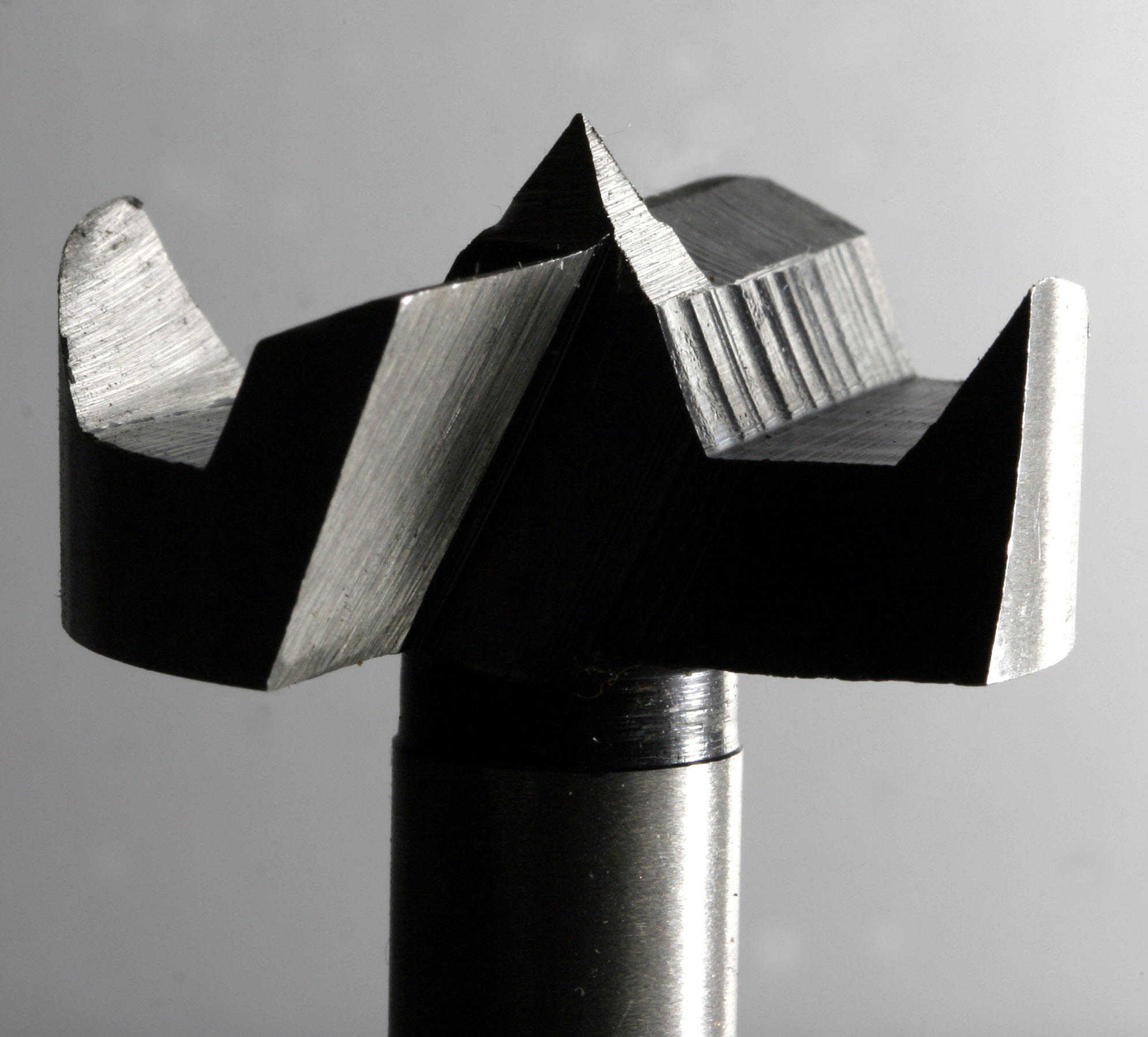
Another Forstner bit

Forstner bits were patented by Benjamin Forstner in 1886. They bore precise, flat-bottomed holes in wood, in any orientation with respect to the wood grain. They can cut on the edge of a block of wood, and can cut overlapping holes; for such applications they are normally used in drill presses or lathes rather than in hand-held electric drills. Because of the flat bottom of the hole, they are useful for drilling through veneer already glued to add an inlay.

The bit includes a center brad point which guides it throughout the cut (and incidentally spoils the otherwise flat bottom of the hole). The cylindrical cutter around the perimeter shears the wood fibers at the edge of the bore, and also helps guide the bit into the material more precisely. Forstner bits have radial cutting edges to plane off the material at the bottom of the hole. Bits may have two or more radial edges. Forstner bits have no mechanism to clear chips from the hole, and therefore must be pulled out periodically.

Sawtooth bits are also available, which include many more cutting edges to the cylinder. These cut faster, but produce a more ragged hole. They have advantages over Forstner bits when boring into end grain.

Bits are commonly available in sizes from 8–50 mm (0.3–2.0 in) diameter. Sawtooth bits are available up to 100 mm (4 in) diameter.

=== Center bit ===
The center bit is optimized for drilling in wood with a hand brace. Many different designs have been produced.

The center of the bit is a tapered screw thread. This screws into the wood as the bit is turned, and pulls the bit into the wood. There is no need for any force to push the bit into the workpiece, only the torque to turn the bit. This is ideal for a bit for a hand tool. The radial cutting edges remove a slice of wood of thickness equal to the pitch of the central screw for each rotation of the bit. To pull the bit from the hole, either the female thread in the wood workpiece must be stripped, or the rotation of the bit must be reversed.

The edge of the bit has a sharpened spur to cut the fibers of the wood, as in the brad point drill bit. A radial cutting edge planes the wood from the base of the hole. In this version, there is minimal or no spiral to remove chips from the hole. The bit must be periodically withdrawn to clear the chips.

Some versions have two spurs. Some have two radial cutting edges.

Center bits do not cut well in the end grain of wood. The central screw tends to pull out, or to split the wood along the grain, and the radial edges have trouble cutting through the long wood fibers.

Center bits are made of relatively soft steel, and can be sharpened with a file.

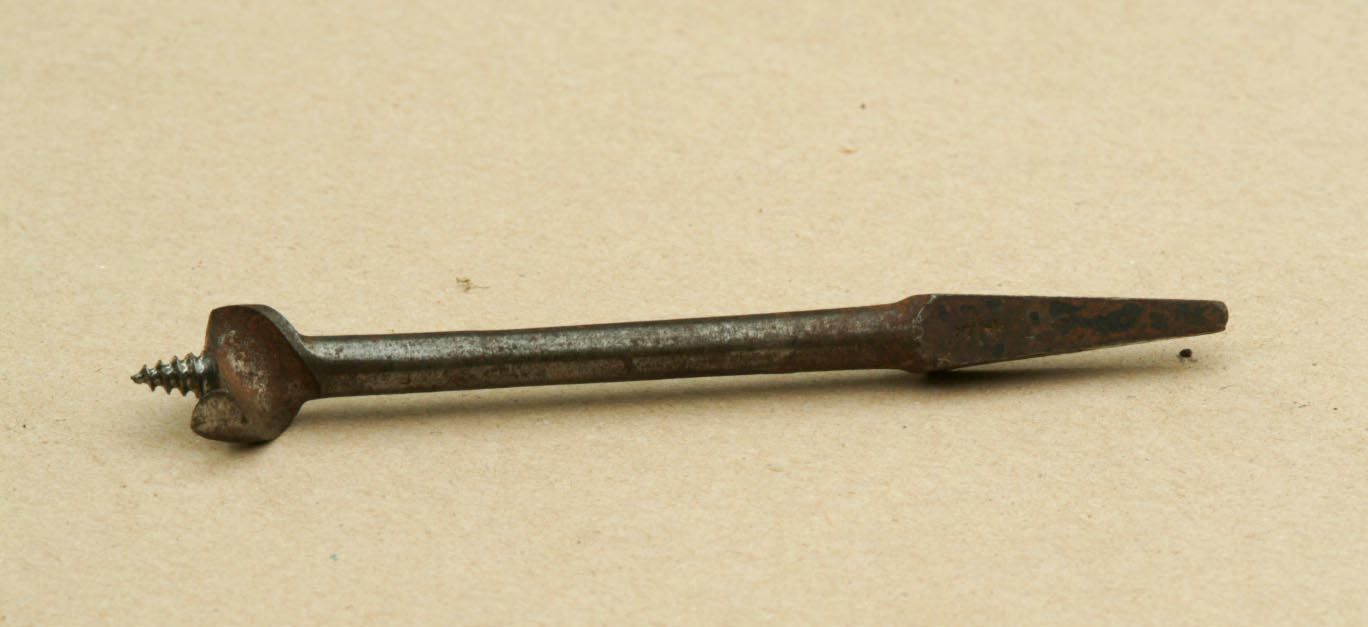
A 19 mm (3/4 inch) center bit, made sometime before 1950

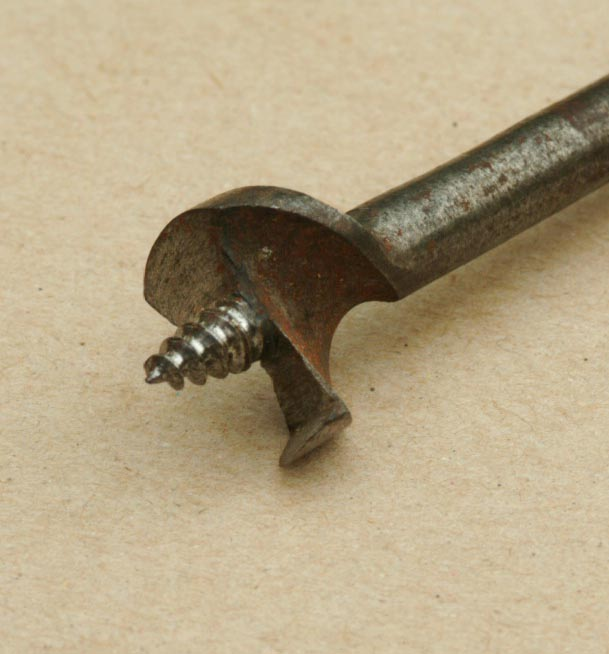
Center bit tip detail

=== Auger bit ===
The cutting principles of the auger bit are the same as those of the center bit above. The auger adds a long deep spiral flute for effective chip removal.

Two styles of auger bit are commonly used in hand braces: the Jennings or Jennings-pattern bit has a self-feeding screw tip, two spurs and two radial cutting edges. This bit has a double flute starting from the cutting edges, and extending several inches up the shank of the bit, for waste removal. This pattern of bit was developed by Russell Jennings in the mid-19th century.

The Irwin or solid-center auger bit is similar, the only difference being that one of the cutting edges has only a "vestigal flute" supporting it, which extends only about 1/2 in (13 mm) up the shank before ending. The other flute continues full-length up the shank for waste removal. The Irwin bit may afford greater space for waste removal, greater strength (because the design allows for a center shank of increased size within the flutes, as compared to the Jenning bits), or smaller manufacturing costs. This style of bit was invented in 1884, and the rights sold to Charles Irwin who patented and marketed this pattern the following year.

Both styles of auger bits were manufactured by several companies throughout the early- and mid-20th century, and are still available new from select sources today.

The diameter of auger bits for hand braces is commonly expressed by a single number, indicating the size in 16ths of an inch. For example, #4 is 4/16 or 1/4 in (6.35 mm), #6 is 6/16 or 3/8 in (9.53 mm), #9 is 9/16 in (14,29 mm), and #16 is 16/16 or 1 in (25,4 mm). Sets commonly consist of #4-16 or #4-10 bits.

The bit shown in the picture is a modern design for use in portable power tools, made in the UK in about 1995. It has a single spur, a single radial cutting edge and a single flute. Similar auger bits are made with diameters from 6 mm (3/16 in) to 30 mm (1 3/16 in). Augers up to 600 mm (2.0 ft) long are available, where the chip-clearing capability is especially valuable for drilling deep holes.

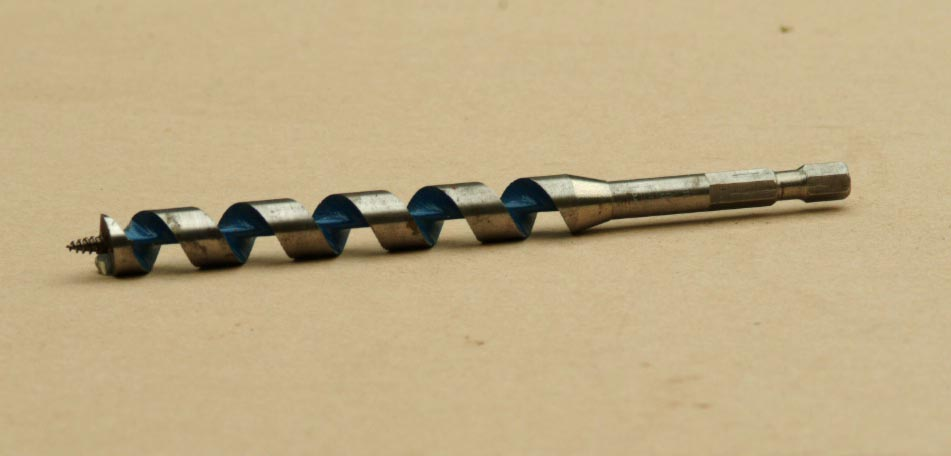
20 mm (0.79 in) auger bit for wood

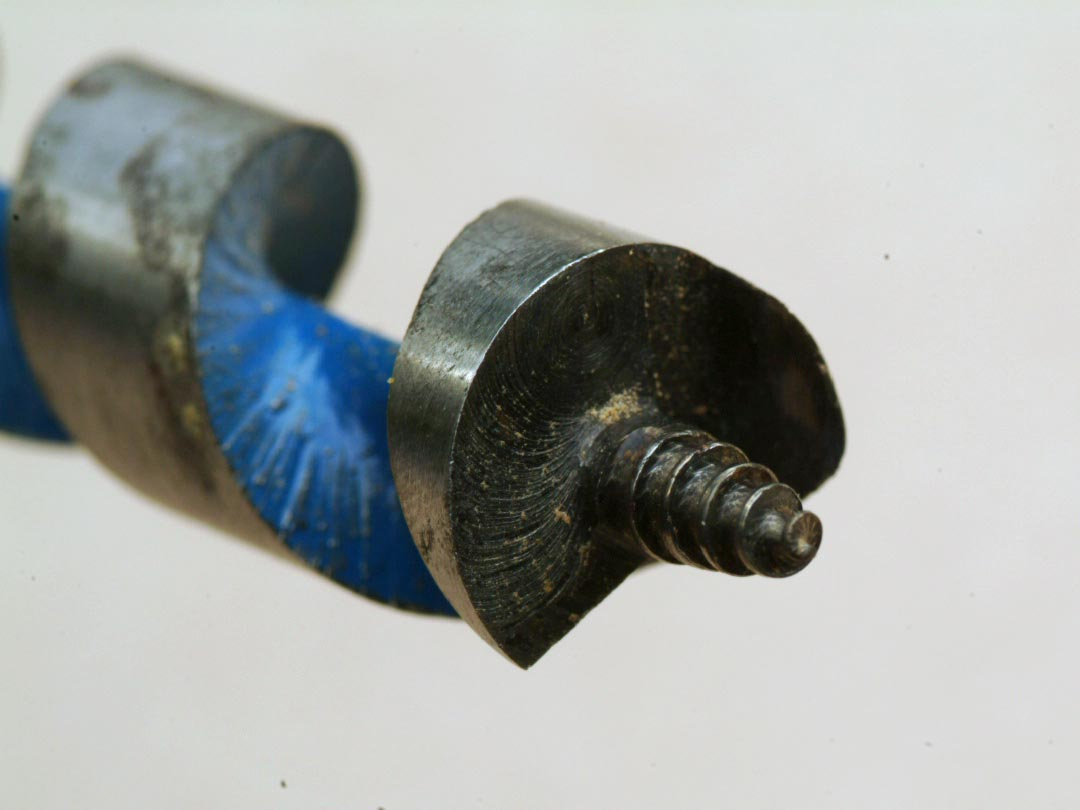
Auger bit tip detail

=== Gimlet bit ===
The gimlet bit is a very old design. The bit is the same style as that used in the gimlet, a self-contained tool for boring small holes in wood by hand. Since about 1850, gimlets have had a variety of cutter designs, but some are still produced with the original version. The gimlet bit is intended to be used in a hand brace for drilling into wood. It is the usual style of bit for use in a brace for holes below about 7 mm (0.28 in) diameter.

The tip of the gimlet bit acts as a tapered screw, to draw the bit into the wood and to begin forcing aside the wood fibers, without necessarily cutting them. The cutting action occurs at the side of the broadest part of the cutter. Most drill bits cut the base of the hole. The gimlet bit cuts the side of the hole.

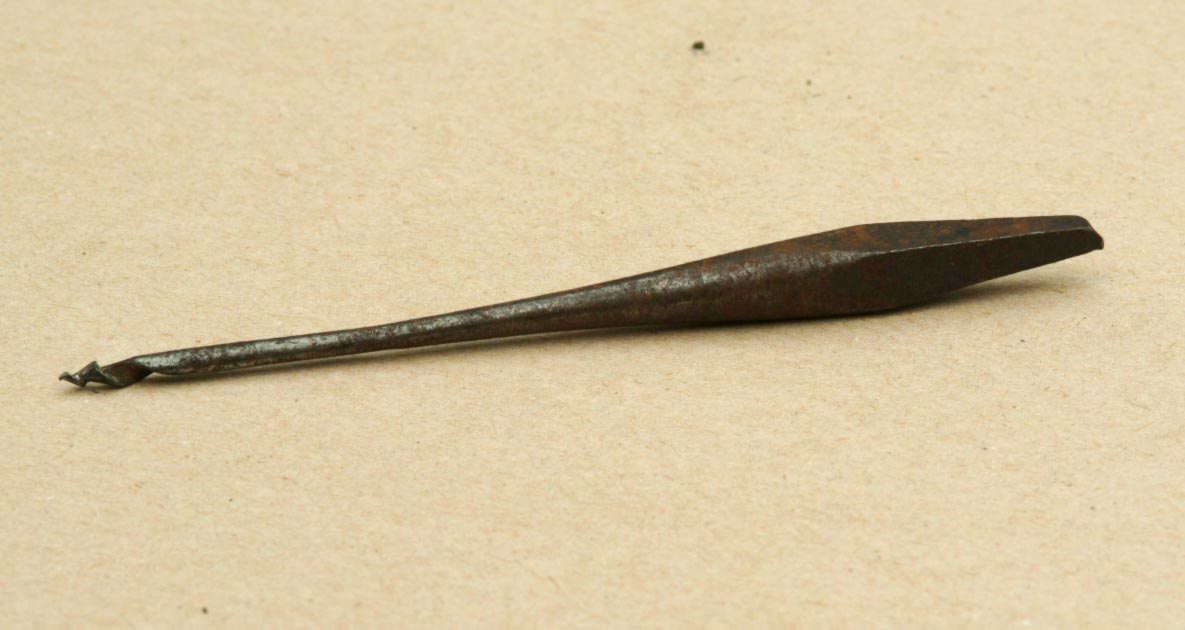
Gimlet bit for wood, made sometime before 1950.

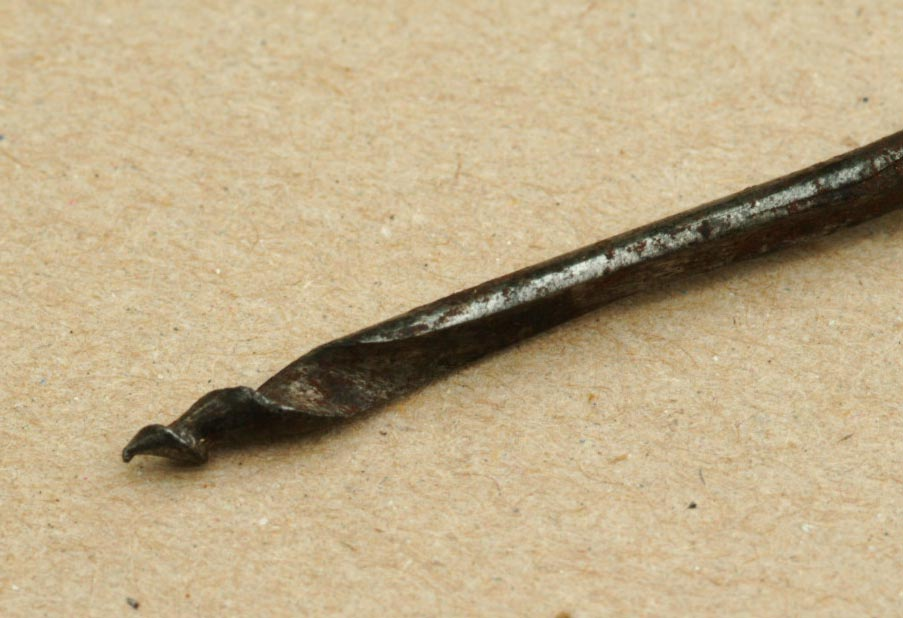
Gimlet bit tip detail

=== Hinge sinker bit ===
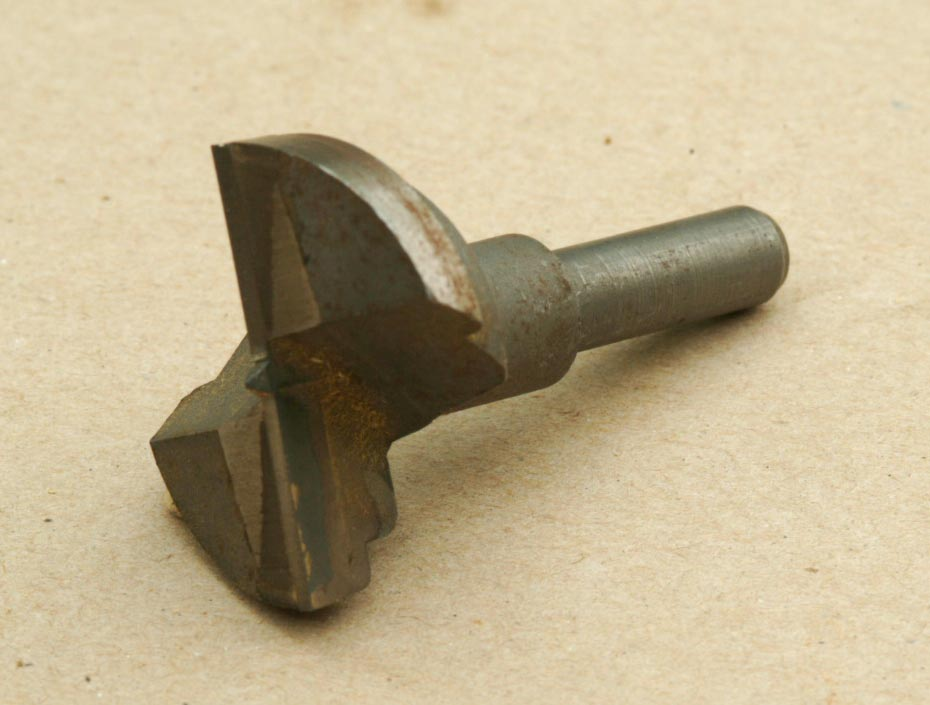
30 mm hinge sinker bit

The hinge sinker bit is an example of a custom drill bit design for a specific application. Many European kitchen cabinets are made from particle board or medium-density fiberboard (MDF) with a laminated melamine resin veneer. Those types of pressed wood boards are not very strong, and the screws of butt hinges tend to pull out. A specialist hinge has been developed which uses the walls of a 35 mm-diameter (1.4 in) hole, bored in the particle board, for support. This is a very common and relatively successful construction method.

A Forstner bit could bore the mounting hole for the hinge, but particle board and MDF are very abrasive materials, and steel cutting edges soon wear. A tungsten carbide cutter is needed, but the complex shape of a forstner bit is difficult to manufacture in carbide, so this special drill bit with a simpler shape is commonly used. It has cutting edges of tungsten carbide brazed to a steel body; a center spur keeps the bit from wandering.

=== Adjustable wood bits ===
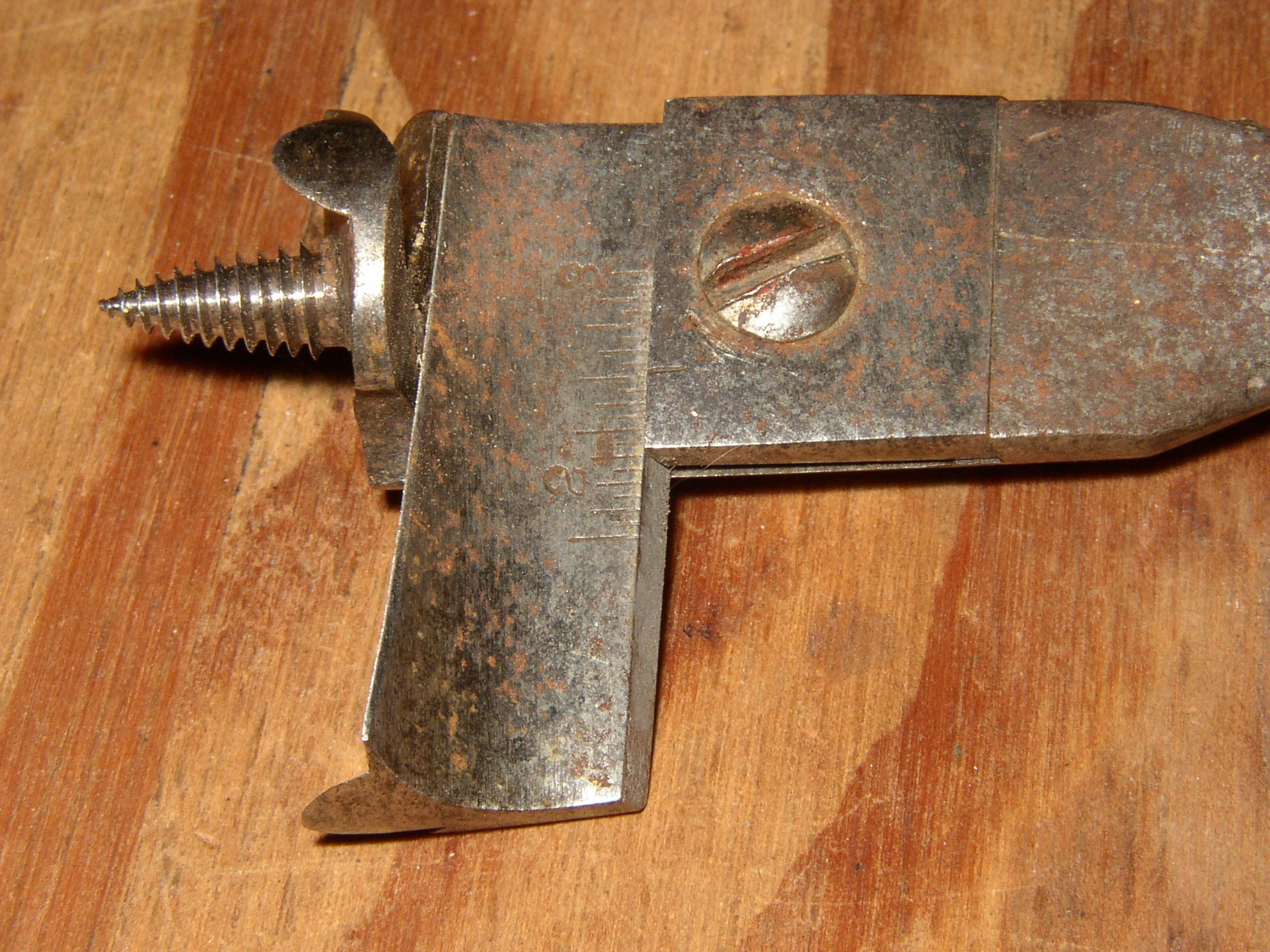
An adjustable wood bit meant for use in a brace

An adjustable wood bit, also known as an expansive wood bit, has a small center pilot bit with an adjustable, sliding cutting edge mounted above it, usually containing a single sharp point at the outside, with a set screw to lock the cutter in position. When the cutting edge is centered on the bit, the hole drilled will be small, and when the cutting edge is slid outwards, a larger hole is drilled. This allows a single drill bit to drill a wide variety of holes, and can take the place of a large, heavy set of different size bits, as well as providing uncommon bit sizes. A ruler or vernier scale is usually provided to allow precise adjustment of the bit size.

These bits are available both in a version similar to an auger bit or brace bit, designed for low speed, high torque use with a brace or other hand drill (pictured to the right), or as a high speed, low torque bit meant for a power drill. While the shape of the cutting edges is different, and one uses screw threads and the other a twist bit for the pilot, the method of adjusting them remains the same.

== Other materials ==
=== Diamond core bit ===
The diamond masonry mortar bit is a hybrid drill bit, designed to work as a combination router and drill bit. It consists of a steel shell, with the diamonds embedded in metal segments attached to the cutting edge. These drill bits are used at relatively low speeds.

=== Masonry drill bit ===
The masonry bit shown here is a variation of the twist drill bit. The bulk of the tool is a relatively soft steel, and is machined with a mill rather than ground. An insert of tungsten carbide is brazed into the steel to provide the cutting edges.

Masonry bits typically are used with a hammer drill, which hammers the bit into the material being drilled as it rotates; the hammering breaks up the masonry at the drill bit tip, and the rotating flutes carry away the dust. Rotating the bit also brings the cutting edges onto a fresh portion of the hole bottom with every hammer blow. Hammer drill bits often use special shank shapes such as the SDS type, which allows the bit to slide within the chuck when hammering, without the whole heavy chuck executing the hammering motion.

Masonry bits of the style shown are commonly available in diameters from 3 mm to 40 mm. For larger diameters, core bits are used. Masonry bits up to 1,000 mm (39 in) long can be used with hand-portable power tools, and are very effective for installing wiring and plumbing in existing buildings.

A star drill bit, similar in appearance and function to a hole punch or chisel, is used as a hand powered drill in conjunction with a hammer to drill into stone and masonry. A star drill bit's cutting edge consists of several blades joined at the center to form a star pattern.

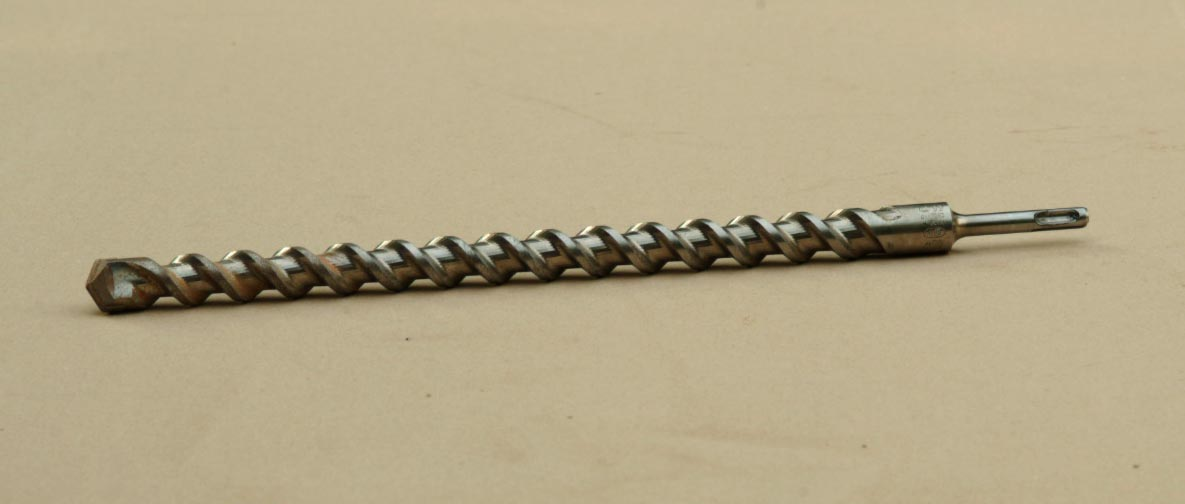
25×500 mm SDS-plus masonry bit

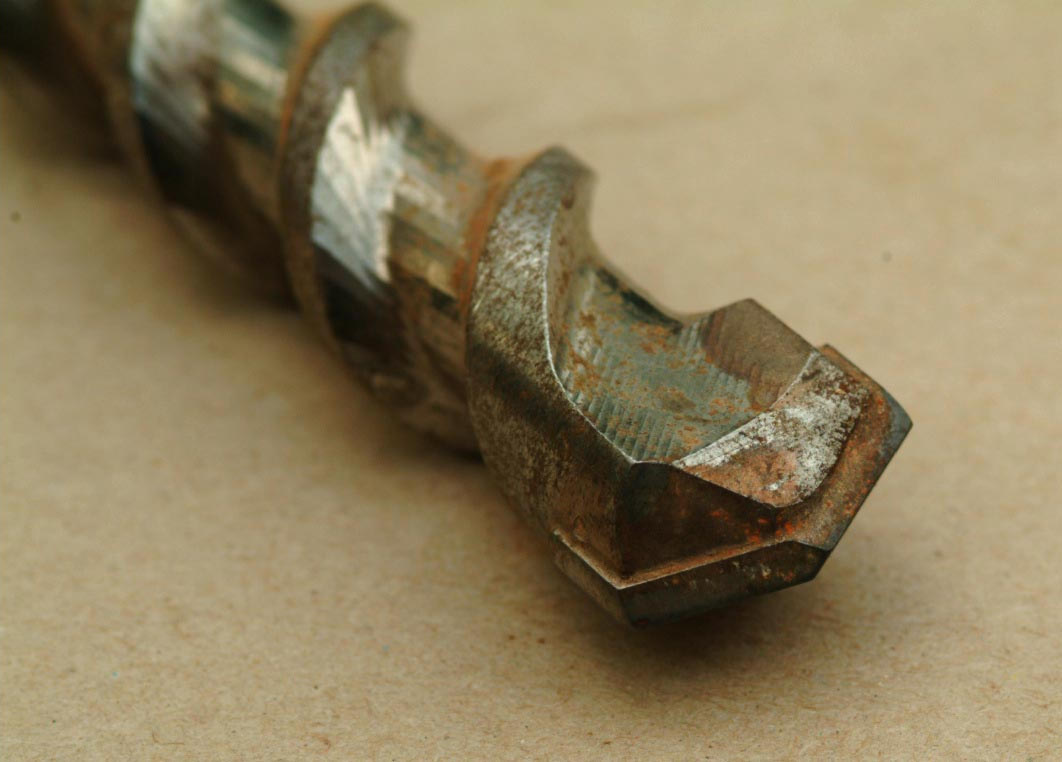
Masonry bit tip

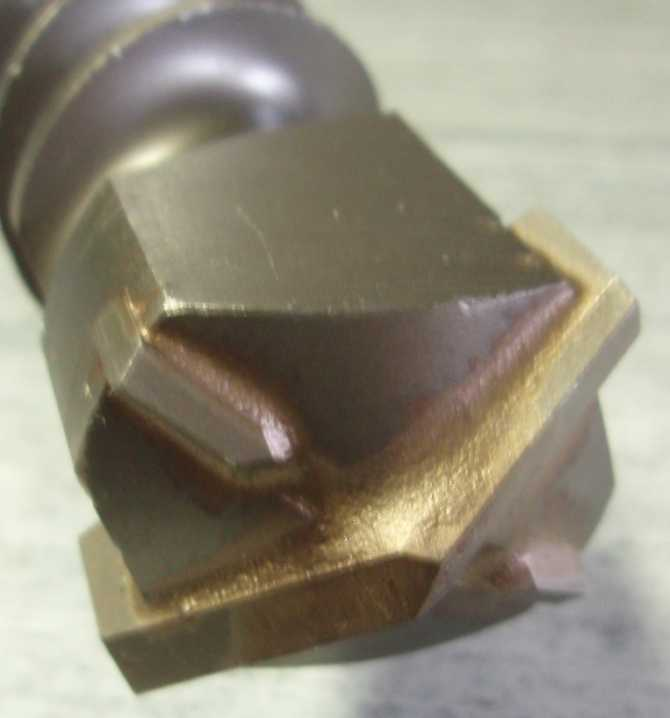
Rebar resistant bit with four carbide cutters

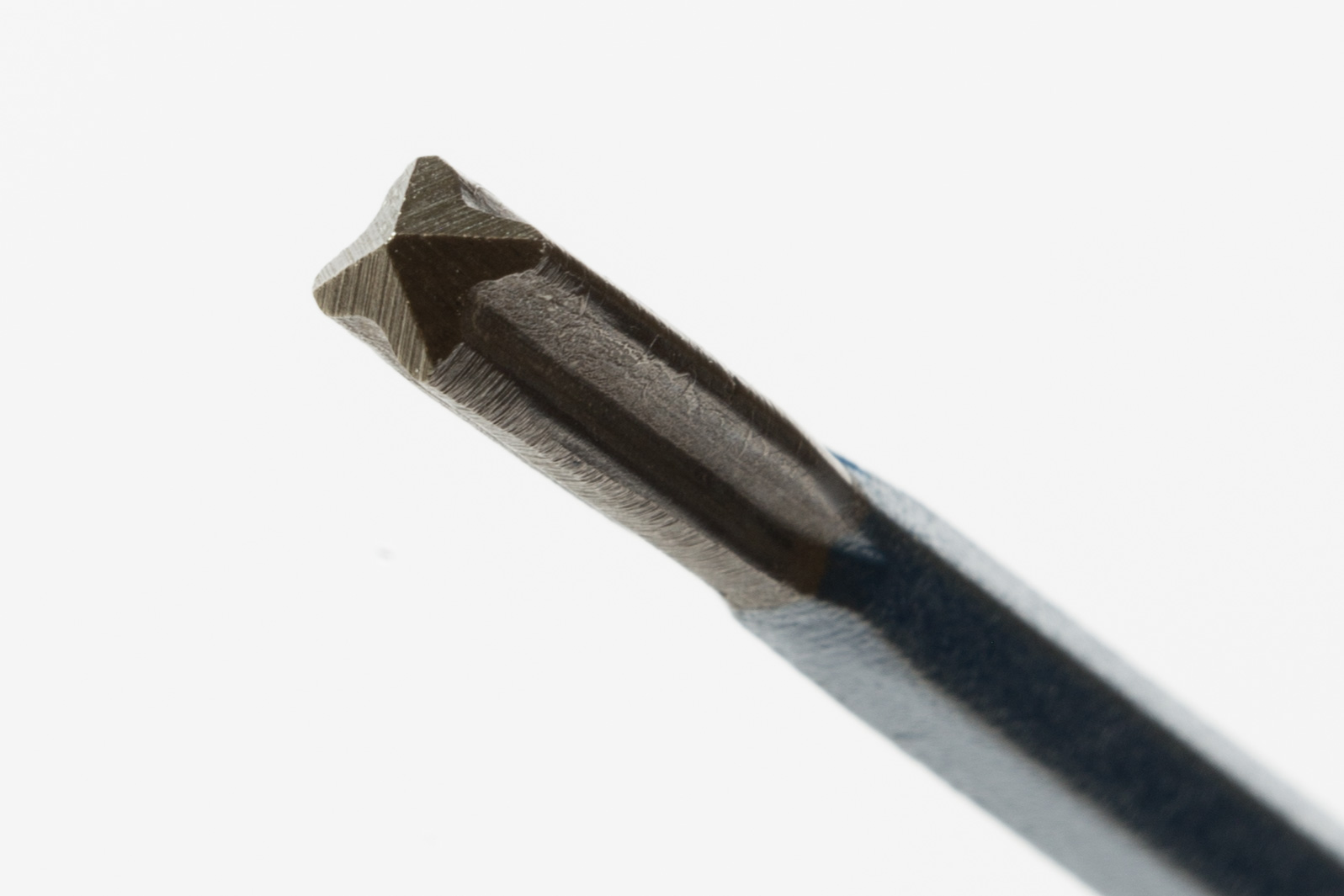
Star drill

=== Glass drill bit ===
Glass bits have a spade-shaped carbide point. They generate high temperatures and have a very short life. Holes are generally drilled at low speed with a succession of increasing bit sizes. Diamond drill bits can also be used to cut holes in glass, and last much longer.

=== Ceramic drill bit ===
Ceramic drill bits are made to drill through glazed and unglazed ceramic tiles, for instance for installing bathroom fittings.

=== PCB through-hole drill bit ===
A great number of holes with small diameters of about 1 mm or less must be drilled in printed circuit boards (PCBs) used by electronic equipment with through-hole components. Most PCBs are made of highly abrasive fiberglass, which quickly wears steel bits, especially given the hundreds or thousands of holes on most circuit boards. To solve this problem, solid tungsten carbide twist bits, which drill quickly through the board while providing a moderately long life, are almost always used. Carbide PCB bits are estimated to outlast high-speed steel bits by a factor of ten or more. Other options sometimes used are diamond or diamond-coated bits.

In industry, virtually all drilling is done by automated machines, and the bits are often automatically replaced by the equipment as they wear, as even solid carbide bits do not last long in constant use. PCB bits, of narrow diameter, typically mount in a collet rather than a chuck, and come with standard-size shanks, often with pre-installed stops to set them at an exact depth every time when being automatically chucked by the equipment.

Very high rotational speeds—30,000 to 100,000 RPM or even higher—are used; this translates to a reasonably fast linear speed of the cutting tip in these very small diameters. The high speed, small diameter, and the brittleness of the material, make the bits very vulnerable to breaking, particularly if the angle of the bit to the workpiece changes at all, or the bit contacts any object. Drilling by hand is not practical, and many general-purpose drilling machines designed for larger bits rotate too slowly and wobble too much to use carbide bits effectively.

Resharpened and easily available PCB drills have historically been used in many prototyping and home PCB labs, using a high-speed rotary tool for small-diameter bits (such as a Moto-Tool by Dremel) in a stiff drill-press jig. If used for other materials these tiny bits must be evaluated for equivalent cutting speed vs material resistance to the cut (hardness), as the bit's rake angle and expected feed per revolution are optimised for high-speed automated use on fiberglass PCB substrate.

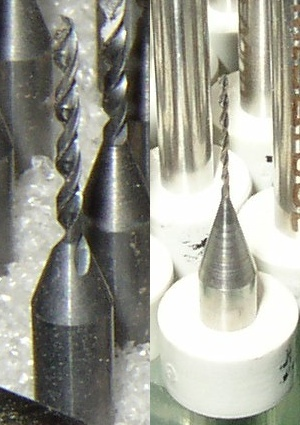
Two PCB drill bits

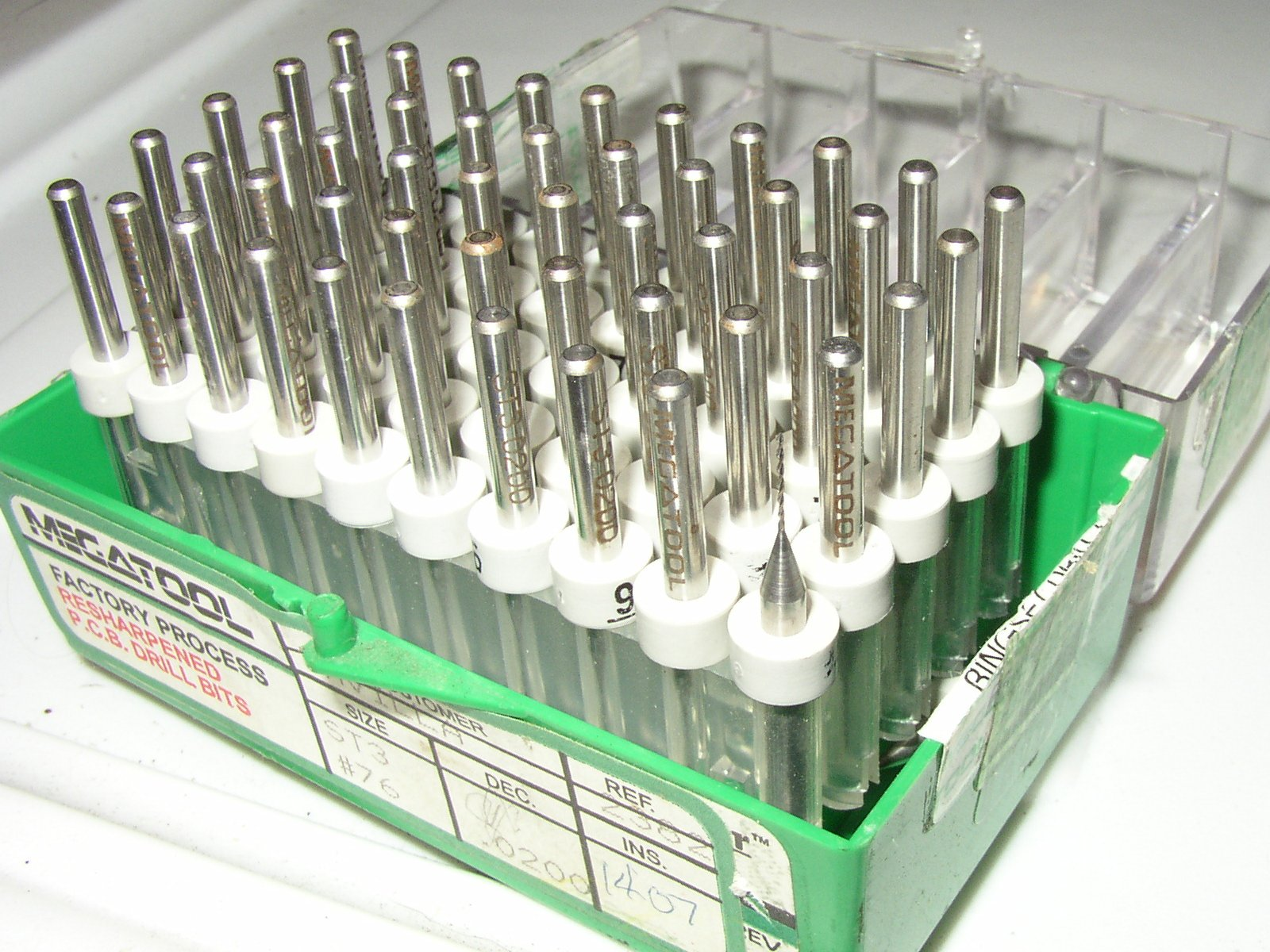
A box of #76 (0.02 in or 0.51 mm) PCB drill bits

=== Installer bit ===
==== Fishing bit ====
Installer bits, also known as bell-hanger bits or fishing bits, are a type of twist drill bit for use with a hand-portable power tool. The key distinguishing feature of an installer bit is a transverse hole drilled through the web of the bit near the tip. Once the bit has penetrated a wall, a wire can be threaded through the hole and the bit pulled back out, pulling the wire with it. The wire can then be used to pull a cable or pipe back through the wall. This is especially helpful where the wall has a large cavity, where threading a fish tape could be difficult. Some installer bits have a transverse hole drilled at the shank end as well. Once a hole has been drilled, the wire can be threaded through the shank end, the bit released from the chuck, and all pulled forward through the drilled hole. These bits are made for cement, block and brick; they are not for drilling into wood. Sinclair Smith of Brooklyn, New York was issued U.S. patent 597,750 for this invention on January 25, 1898.

Installer bits are available in various materials and styles for drilling wood, masonry and metal.

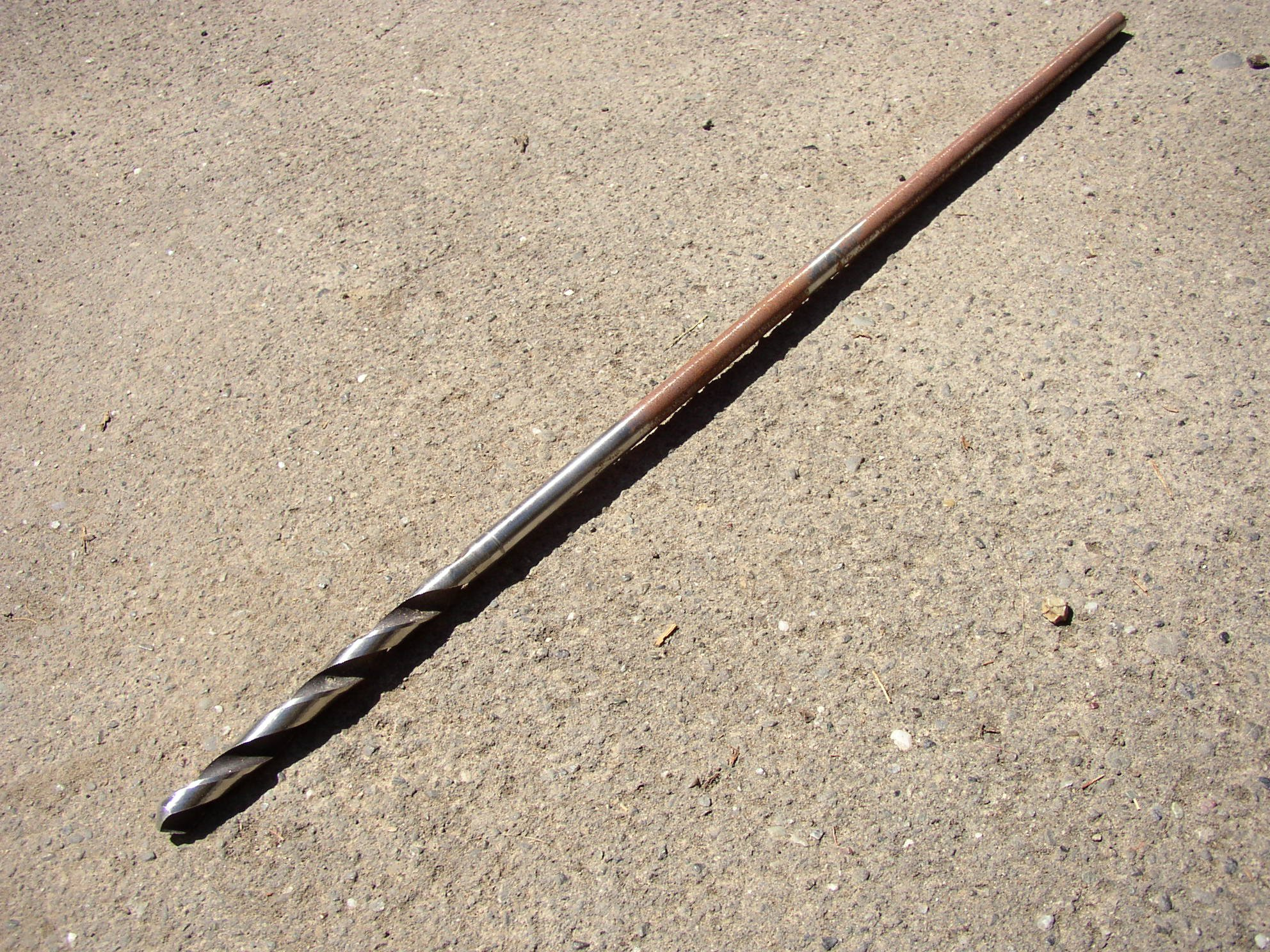
A 3/8 in × 18 in (9.5 mm × 457.2 mm) installer bit

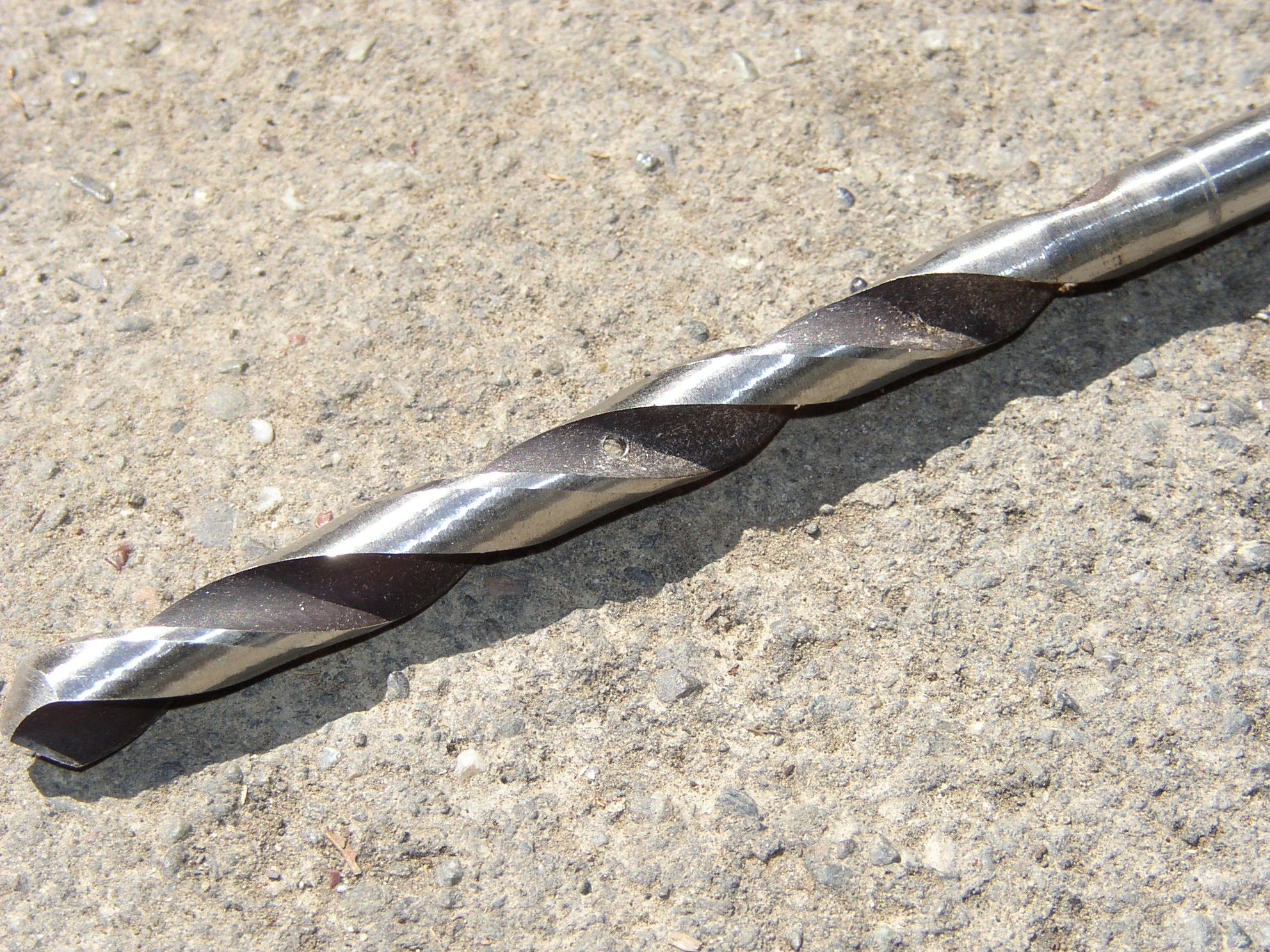
Closeup of installer bit. The fishing hole is visible in the flute in the center of the picture.

==== Flexible shaft bit ====
Another, different, bit also called an installer bit has a very long flexible shaft, typically up to 72 inches (1.8 m) long, with a small twist bit at the end. The shaft is made of spring steel instead of hardened steel, so it can be flexed while drilling without breaking. This allows the bit to be curved inside walls, for example to drill through studs from a light switch box without needing to remove any material from the wall. These bits usually come with a set of special tools to aim and flex the bit to reach the desired location and angle, although the problem of seeing where the operator is drilling still remains.

This flexible installer bit is used in the US, but does not appear to be routinely available in Europe.

== Drill bit shank ==
Different shapes of shank are used. Some are simply the most appropriate for the chuck used; in other cases particular combinations of shank and chuck give performance advantages, such as allowing higher torque, greater centering accuracy, or efficient hammering action.

== See also ==
- Drill and tap size chart
- Drill bit shank
- Drill bit sizes
- Drill rod
- Endmill
