= Benjamin Forstner =

American inventor and gunsmith (1834–1897)

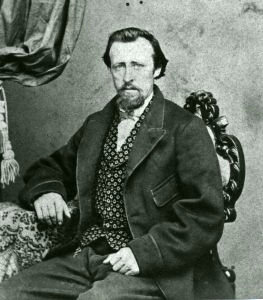
- Born: Benjamin Forstner; March 25, 1834; Beaver County, Pennsylvania
- Died: February 27, 1897 (aged 62); Salem, Oregon
- Occupations: Gunsmith, Inventor, Merchant

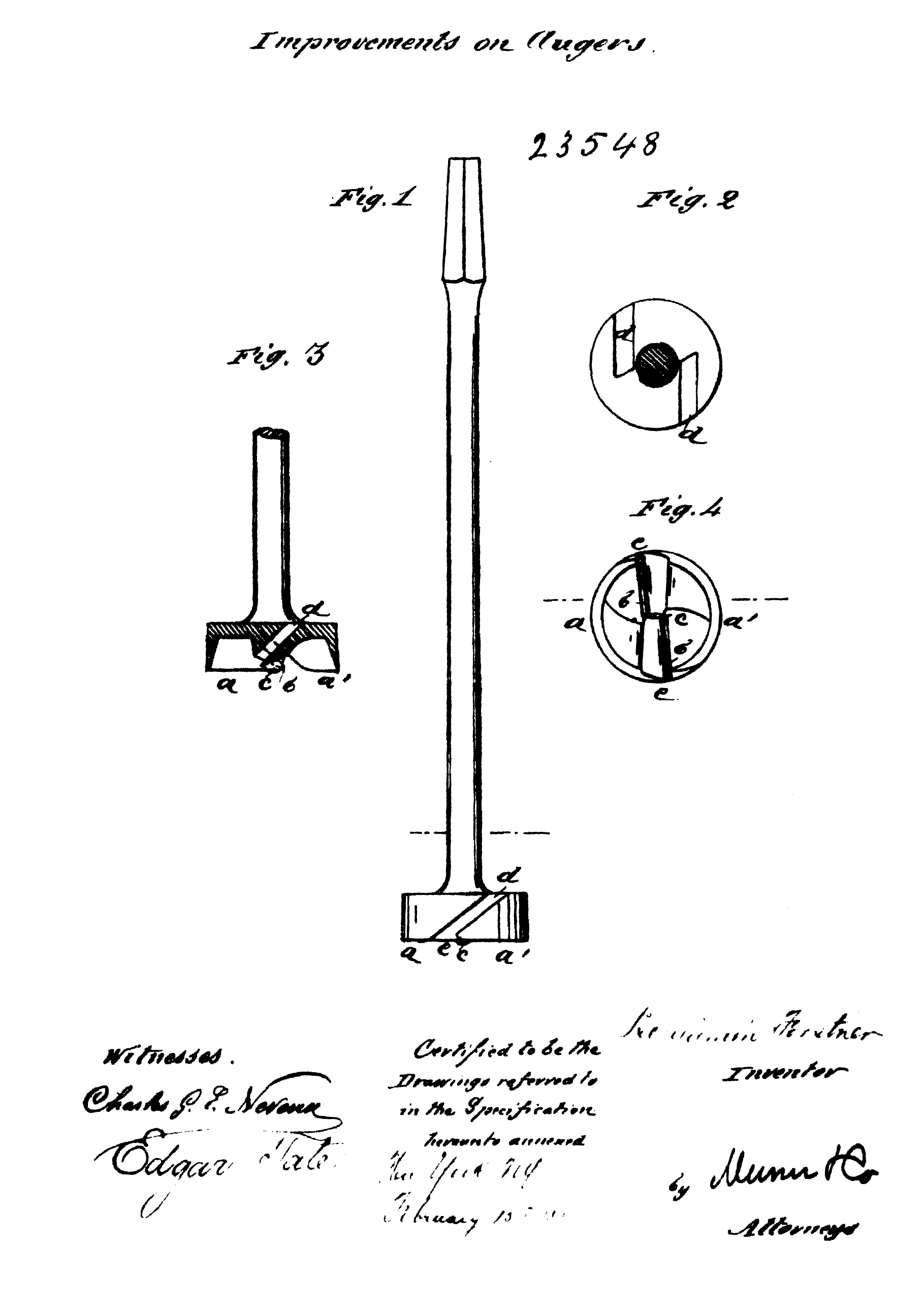
Drawing of his Forstner bit in his patent CA23548

Benjamin Forstner (March 25, 1834 – February 27, 1897), was an American gunsmith, inventor, and dry goods merchant best known for his Forstner bit, a drill bit which enables the creation of accurate flat-bottomed holes in wood, regardless of grain orientation.

== Early life ==
Forstner was born in Beaver County, Pennsylvania.

== Forstner bit ==
In 1886, Forstner patented the Forstner bit. The bit was revolutionary as it did not feature the lead screw (which Forstner called the "gimlet-point") or the cutting lips of more conventional wood boring bits, and thus proved especially useful to gunsmiths and high-end woodworkers. The bit was unsurpassed in drilling a smooth-sided hole with a flat bottom. It was also better than Russell Jennings twist bits for boring at an angle and not following the grain of the wood.

Forstner eventually made arrangements for the manufacturing and sale of his bit with two Connecticut firms: Colt's Manufacturing Company of Hartford, and Bridgeport Gun Implement Company, successors to Union Metallic Cartridge Company. The Forstner bit continues to be manufactured, although it has evolved into a split-ring design. Also, modern Forstner bits normally feature a (non-screw) lead point (AKA "brad point" or "center spur"), unlike Forstner's original, although rim-guided bits are still available from some manufacturers.

== Career ==
Forstner invented an electric motor.

In the early 1850s, he moved to Missouri where he fell under the influence of communal Utopian William Keil. He followed Keil to the Pacific Northwest in 1863, where they founded the colony of Aurora in Marion County, Oregon. In 1865 Forstner settled in Salem, Oregon, and the following year married Louisa Snyder. Their only child was an adopted daughter, Snyder's niece. Forstner became established as a gunsmith. He often traveled on business trips, mainly on the east coast, including the 1876 Centennial Exhibition in Philadelphia and the 1893 World's Columbian Exposition in Chicago where his bits won recognition. Through lucrative royalty payments he became a wealthy Salem citizen and property owner.

== Legacy ==
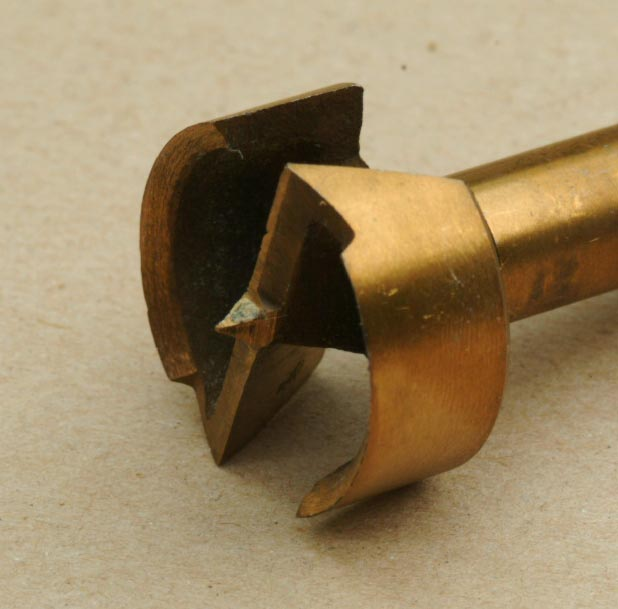
Modern 25mm Forstner bit with 4-sided brad point

Forstner retired in 1891. His residence and workshop were situated on the west side of Commercial Street and later occupied by the Salem woolen mill store and E. F. Neff. He erected a large residence on his land near the northern end of Commercial Street. He possessed considerable farm property across the river in Polk county, and also owned 160 acres (0.65 km^{2}) of timber near Gates, on the upper Santiam river.

Forstner died in Salem, Oregon after a prolonged bout of flu. He was interred on 2 March 1897.

His wife Louisa died 12 Sept 1897, aged 75, at 265 North Commercial Street, Salem, and was buried in Odd Fellows cemetery.
