= Universal lathe =

Type of lathe

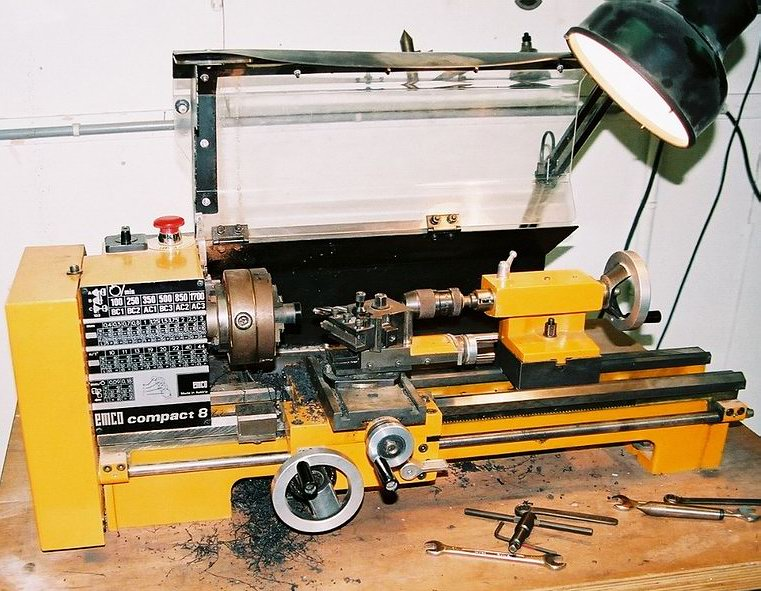
Benchtop universal lathe

A universal lathe or parallel lathe is the most common type of lathe. It differs from other types of lathes in that it has the option of a tailstock, separate mechanisms for longitudinal and transverse feeds (typically via separate handwheels), and an automatic (usually mechanically) driven longitudinal leadscrew for making threads.

== Description ==
Universal lathes are used for the production of single products or small batches, and are suitable for maintenance and similar minor work in a workshop, as well as anywhere there is a need for tools that should be as versatile as possible.

On universal lathes, one can turn longitudinally, transversely, one can turn cylindrical and conical threads, Archimedean spirals, one can also bore, countersink, ream, tap threads with taps and dies, manually polish and file. Extra accessories enables ball turning, copying and grinding. There are even aftermarket accessories for milling; typically by replacing the top slide (compound) with a milling head and a spindle for mounting the milling bit, but sometimes instead by mounting a coordinate table in place of the top slide and by mounting the milling bit in the main spindle.

The conventional layout is that the main spindle is located on the left side, while the tailstock is located on the right side.

== See also ==
- Automatic lathe
- Frontal lathe
- Vertical lathe
