= Vertical lathe =

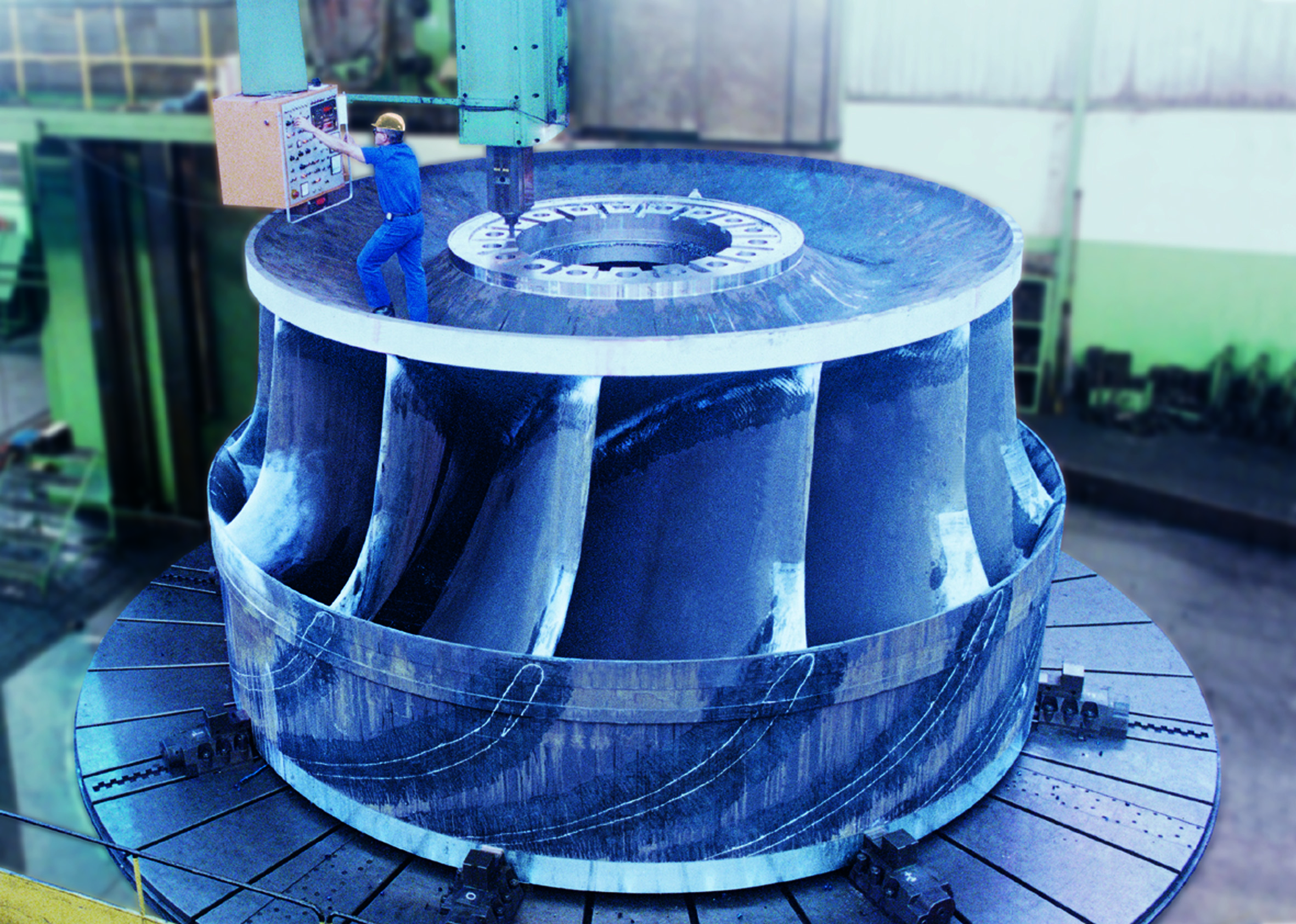
Large vertical lathe used for machining water turbines, with a face in the order of 10 to 15 meters in diameter (see worker on top of turbine for scale)

A vertical lathe is a lathe where the axis of rotation is oriented vertically, unlike most conventional lathes which are oriented horizontally. Many of them are frontal lathes, meaning they do not have the option of mounting a tailstock, but vertical lathes can also be implemented as parallel lathes.

Vertical lathes can provide better surface finishes since gravity helps to load the workpiece and tool, and typically takes up less space in a workshop than a horizontal lathe. They can also be suitable for workpieces that are fragile, as gravity helps with holding the workpiece in place.

The fact that the headstock rotates in the horizontal plane makes vertical lathes particularly well suited for large and heavy workpieces, as it makes clamping easier and safer. In the industry, vertical lathes can vary considerably in size, with swing diameters from under 1 meter to over 20 meters.

== Construction ==
- The rotating plate is often a cast iron faceplate with T-slots for clamping workpieces. The diameter of the face plate is important for the size of the workpiece that can be clamped. It rests on the frame against one or more bedways (flat or V-shaped) to reduce contact pressure and ensure good lubrication.
- The rotation is controlled by a vertical shaft attached to the frame, and the driving force is transmitted by a pinion that connects the crown gear to the face plate. This prevents torsional forces on the spindle.
- The lathe may have one or more tool holders and carriages.
- Small lathes have a single column, while large ones have double columns.

== Use ==
In industry, such machines are used for machining very large parts. To avoid unnecessary assembly and disassembly, other operations can also be performed in the same setup, including drilling, milling, reaming, threading, et cetera.

== See also ==
- Lathe
- Automatic lathe
- Universal lathe
- Frontal lathe
- Machining
- Potter's wheel
