= Frontal lathe =

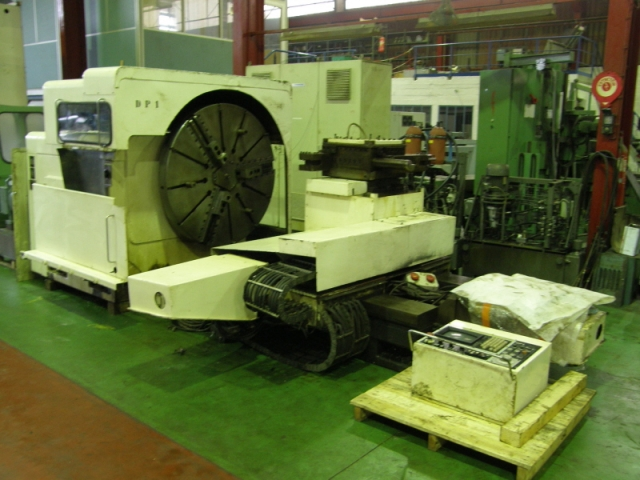
Frontal lathe

A frontal lathe or face lathe is a type of lathe with a horizontal headstock, and without a tailstock. They are suitable for workpieces with a very large diameter (in some cases over 3 meters), but with a relatively short length.

Advantages include their simple and inexpensive construction, good access around the workpiece, and a good overview of the work. Disadvantages include that it can be difficult to clamp the workpiece into place safely, and that the front bearing on the spindle is heavily loaded, which is less favourable for accuracy.

== Description ==
There are several different designs of frontal lathes. In particular, a distinction is made between lathes where the bedway is parallel to the axis of the main spindle (similar to a universal lathe), and lathes where the bedway is perpendicular to the axis of the main spindle (similar to the letter T in a floor plan).

In industry, face lathes have evolved from the general purpose universal lathe to specialized applications. The face lathe is in some cases a precursor to modern CNC turret lathes, which are a type of lathe in which several tools are mounted on a rotating head.

For watchmaking, face lathes have been used since the 18th century and are still common for prototyping.

== See also ==
- Vertical lathe, sometimes preferred due to safer mounting
- Automatic lathe
- Universal lathe
