= Glass working =

Techniques and artistic styles using glass

Glass working refers collectively to a wide range of techniques and artistic styles that use glass as the primary medium. Some common forms of glass working are:

- Glassblowing, the creation of hollow objects such as bottles and vases by blowing air through molten glass
- Glass sculpture, works sculpted or molded from glass
- Stained glass, glass colored by various means, usually in an artistic fashion

== See also ==
- Glass beadmaking
- Glass polishing
- Glass production
- History of glass

=== Other media ===
- metal working
- wood working
