= Coiling (pottery) =

Method of making pottery

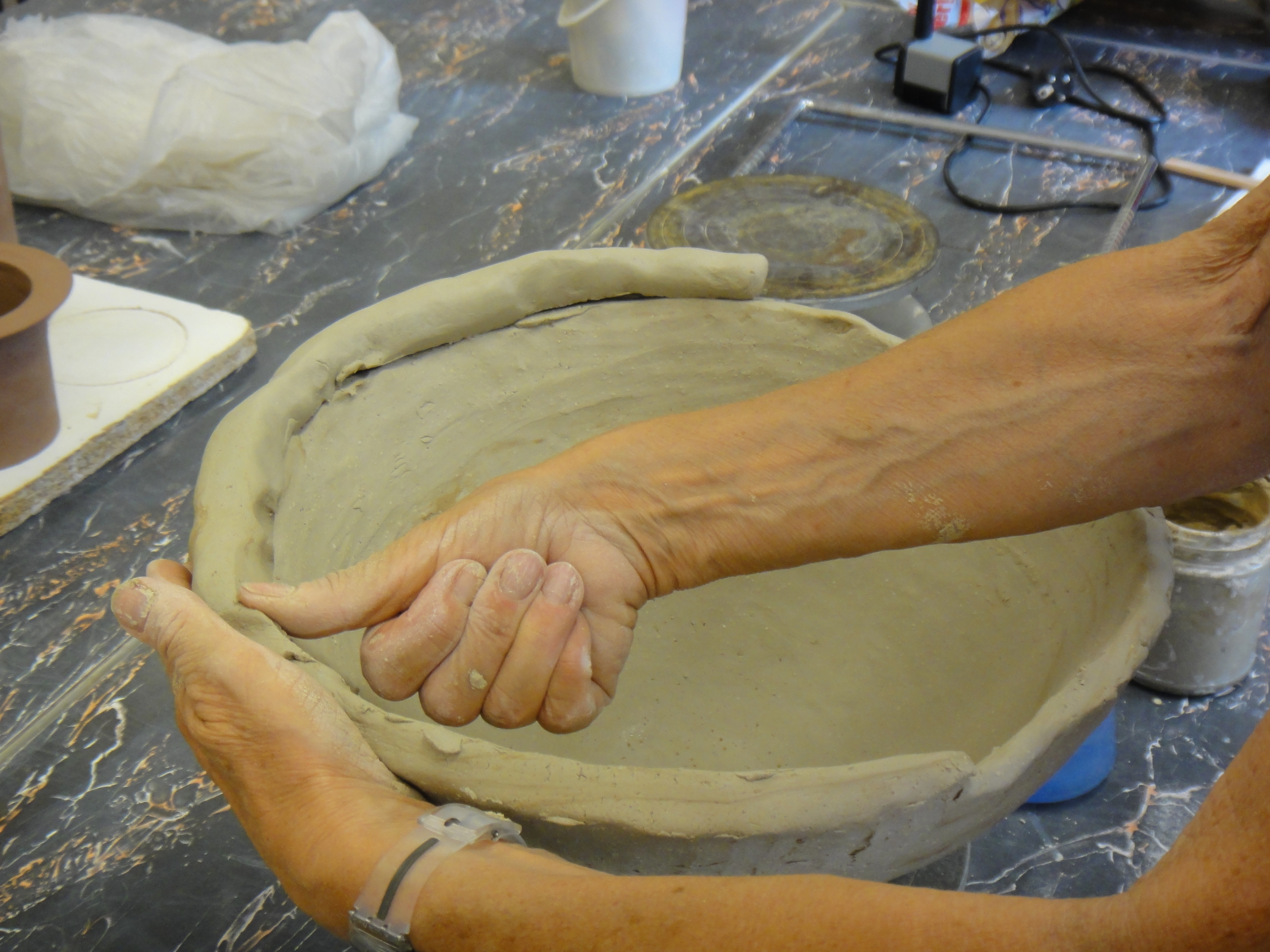
Making a pot with the coiling technique.

Coiling is a method of creating pottery. The coiling technique is used to construct ceramic vessels through the repeated winding of long, cylindrical pieces of clay on top of one another. This technique can be used in combination with other techniques such as throwing on a potter's wheel, slab building, wheel coiling, beating, and pinching.

The benefits of coiling as compared to throwing on a potter's wheel are that coiling allows for greater variety in the shape of the vessel: coiled vessels can be any shape, with more extreme fluctuations in the walls by allowing the clay to dry in-between building stages.

Coiling does not require a potter's wheel, as it is a hand-building technique, but the wheel can be used to make a vessel more symmetrical. Symmetry is beneficial because round vessels are less likely to crack under intense heat and are more durable than organic, asymmetrical structures.

The coiling technique has been used throughout history by numerous civilizations and cultures, including in Africa, Europe, Egypt, North America, and Asia. Some coil-built pottery dates back to the Early Neolithic era.

== Historical usage ==
=== Egypt ===
Pottery in Egypt can be traced back to the Predynastic Period (c. 3800 BCE). Vessels were constructed using the coiling method, among other techniques (such as throwing on a potter's wheel, molding, slab building, and modeling).

A well-known, coil-based Egyptian style of pottery from the Predynastic Period is black-topped pottery. Pottery of this style appears to be over-fired, or burnt, on the top. This style began accidentally because of unpredictable pit-firing methods and gradually became a sought-after feature.

The potter's wheel was introduced to Egypt in 2600 BCE by the Near East. With this introduction, potters began to use this technology to assist in hand-building techniques like coiling. Hand-building continued to be a prominent means of construction used to produce small ceremonial vessels.

=== Asia ===
In Japan, the coiling technique can be traced back to the Jōmon period (c. 10,500 – c. 300 BCE). Archeologists identified the technique by locating "butt-to-butt" joints between coils.

In China, coiling was a dominant technique in pottery making. Potters utilized two sub-techniques of coiling. One of these techniques left the appearance of stripes on the interior and exterior of the vessel made by a fork-like object. This technique was the first to emerge. The second technique, which chronologically followed striped pottery, consisted of a smooth surface. For decoration, there were two additional techniques utilized. One technique used a wooden paddle wrapped in cord to stamp impressions into the exterior walls of the vessel; this is known as "cord-mark pottery", which emerged at the same time as smooth pottery. An additional technique used a woven mat to stamp impressions into the exterior walls—this is known as "woven pattern pottery" and is the most recent technique.

=== North America ===
The coiling technique can be observed in Native American pottery. There is evidence of usage by the Catawba, Cherokee, and Pamunkey people.

The Catawba people utilized two specific sub-techniques of coiling: "ring" and "circuit." The primary difference between these two sub-techniques is whether or not the coil is closed prior to its attachment to the base, or previous coils.

The pottery of ancient Cherokee people, dating back to 1400 CE, differs from that of the Catawba in the application of coils. Rather than building up one layer at a time, a long coil is formed and wound around until the desired size and shape is reached. Tools used to smooth coils together were shells and quartz rocks. This style is modeled in the modern day pottery of the Iroquois people. To begin, potters build a pinch pot as the base of a vessel and proceed to add long, overlapping coils to build the vessel up in strength, shape, and size. The coils are blended by hand. For decoration, modern Iroquois potters use only their hands, a wooden paddle, and a small stick.
