= Andrey Nartov =

Russian sculptor, scientist and military engineer

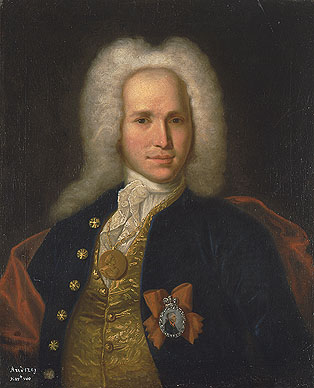
Andrey Nartov

Andrey Konstantinovich Nartov (Russian: Андрей Константинович Нартов) (1683—1756) was a Russian scientist, military engineer, inventor and sculptor. He was a personal craftsman of Peter I of Russia, and later a member of the Russian Academy of Science.

== Career ==
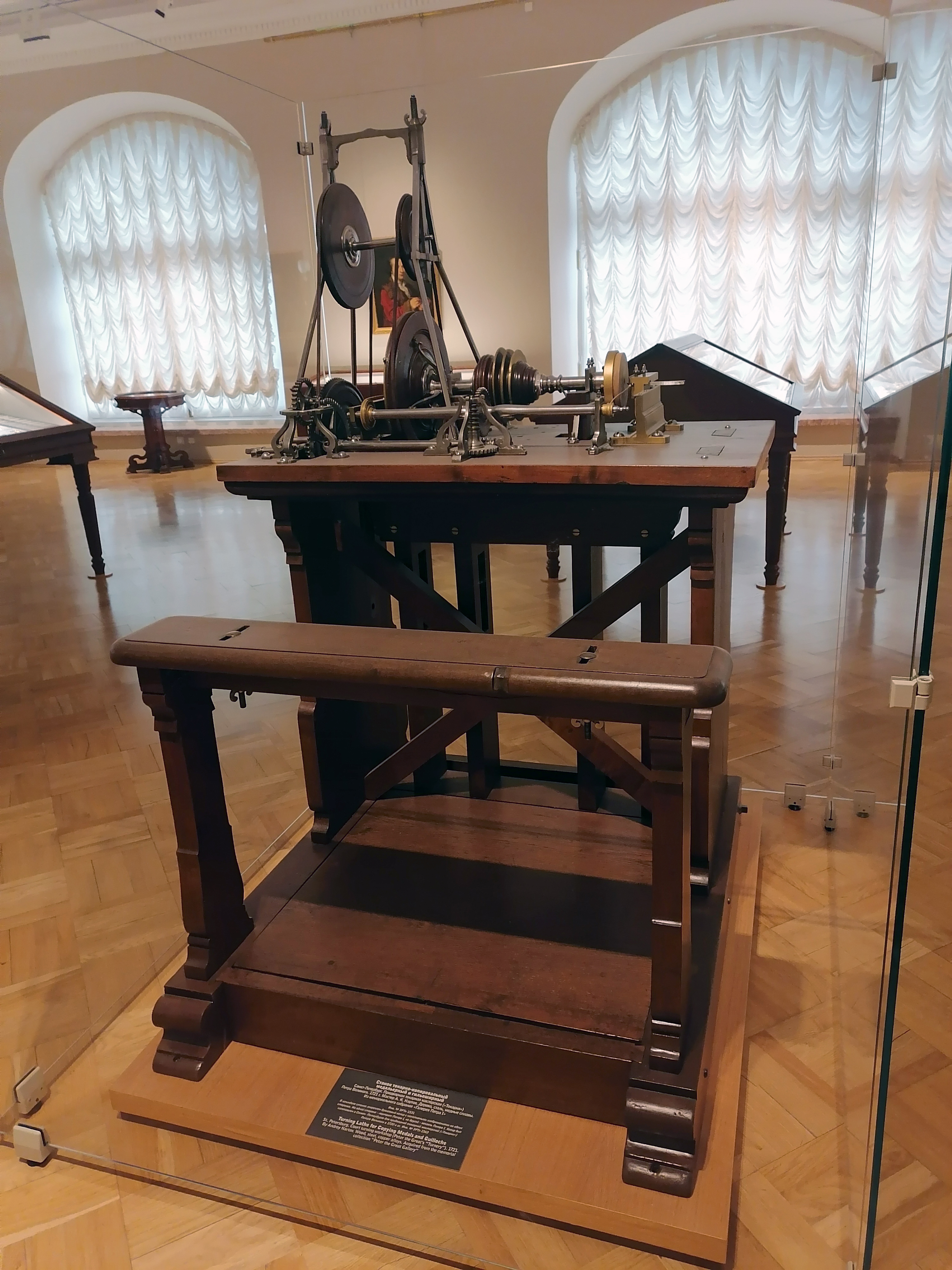
Nartov's copying lathe, 1721

From 1705 Nartov worked in the lathe workshop at the Moscow School of Mathematics and Navigation in the Sukharev Tower, Moscow. During the period 1712-1725 Nartov worked in the newly founded Saint Petersburg, at the palace workshop of the Tsar Peter the Great. There he constructed many lathes of different types and made a number of innovations. Of special value was his copying lathe for the purpose of ornamental turning, which allowed the user to make ornaments with the same precision as that of handicraft work of that time. The Hermitage Museum, Russia displays the copying lathe for ornamental turning: making medals and guilloche patterns designed by Nartov, 1721.

In 1718 Nartov invented what might have been the first lathe with a mechanical cutting tool-supporting carriage and a set of gears. Using the inventions of Andrei Nartov, and especially the Nartov project of screw-cutting lathe designed in 1738, Osip (Joseph) Boton, a mechanic and inventor of English origin who worked in St. Petersburg, in 1749 created a new screw-cutting lathe, similar in design to screw-cutting lathes of the 19th and 20th centuries. The lathes developed by Boton were used in the factories of St. Petersburg and presumably design of this lathes could have influenced (through British engineers working in St. Petersburg, and in particular through Joseph Bentham) the development of machine tools in England during the era of the industrial revolution.

In 1718-1719 Nartov travelled to England and France and demonstrated his lathes. In his letters to Peter I, Nartov wrote that nowhere in Europe could he find lathe masters comparable to Russian ones. On his way back to Russia, he taught lathe-working to the Prussian King Friedrich Wilhelm I.

After the death of Peter I in 1725 Nartov went to work at the Moscow Mint, where he supervised modernisation of the machinery. In 1727 Nartov wrote a book about Peter the Great, containing many interesting historic details of the scenes that Nartov witnessed when he worked at the palace workshop together with the Tsar. That book became the source of many historical anecdotes about Peter the Great.

In 1735 Nartov was elected a member of the Russian Academy of Science, where he was one of the few Russians amongst many Germans and other foreigners. From 1736 to the end of his life Nartov was head of the Academy's lathe workshop.

Among other inventions of Nartov are such things as a unique fast-fire battery on a rotating disc, a screw mechanism for changing the artillery fire angle, a gauge-boring lathe for cannon-making and an early telescopic sight.

Nartov supervised the building of a device intended to lift the gigantic Tsar Bell onto a bell-tower. He designed the rides for Riding Mountains, 18th century roller coasters in royal residences in Russia.

== See also ==
- List of Russian inventors
