= Copying lathe =

Type of lathe

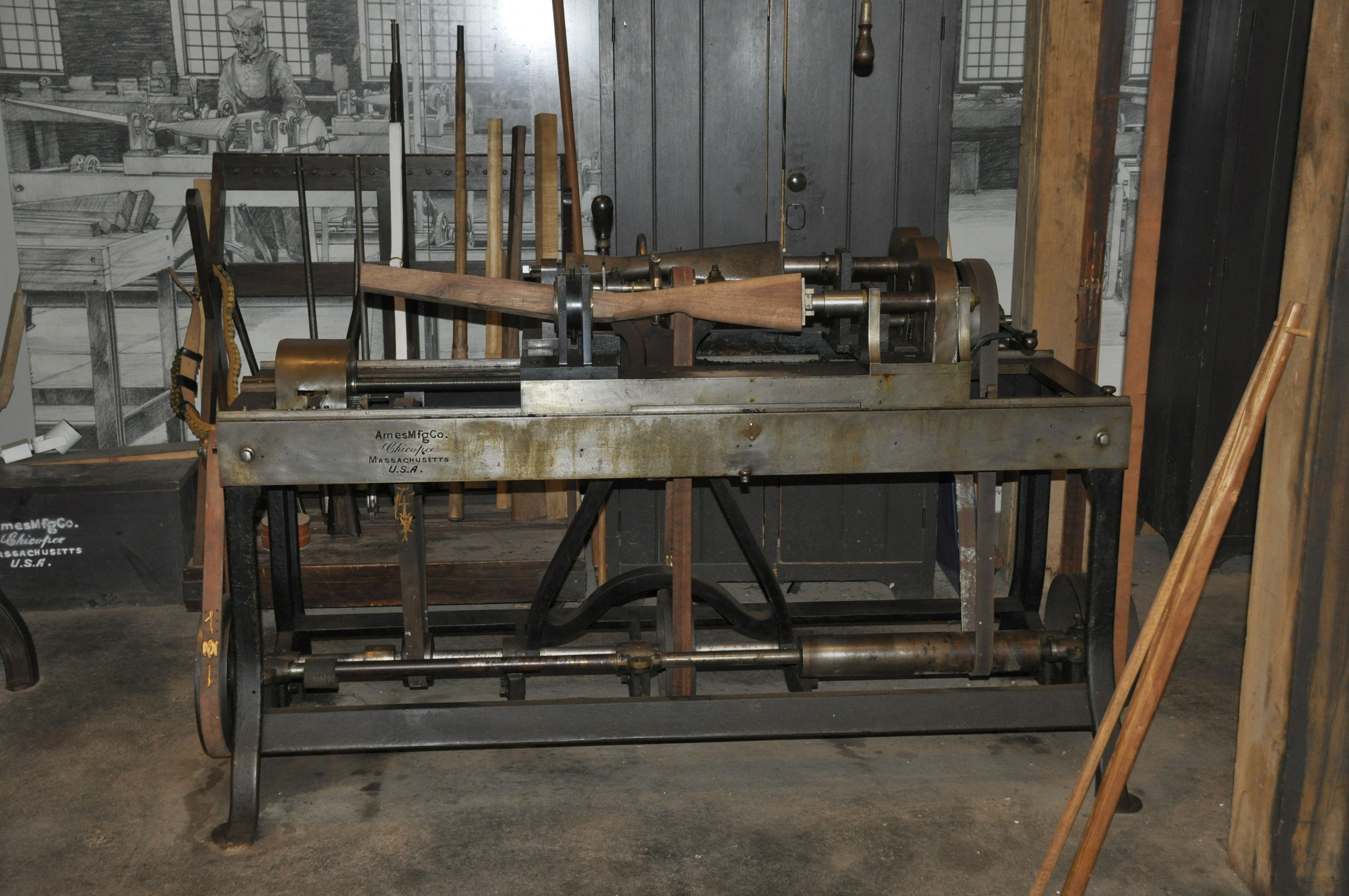
Water-powered Blanchard lathe used for duplicating gun stocks from the 1850s. Harpers Ferry Armory.

The copying lathe or duplicating lathe is a lathe that creates shapes identical to the specified pattern.

== Early inventions ==
=== Nartov's lathe ===
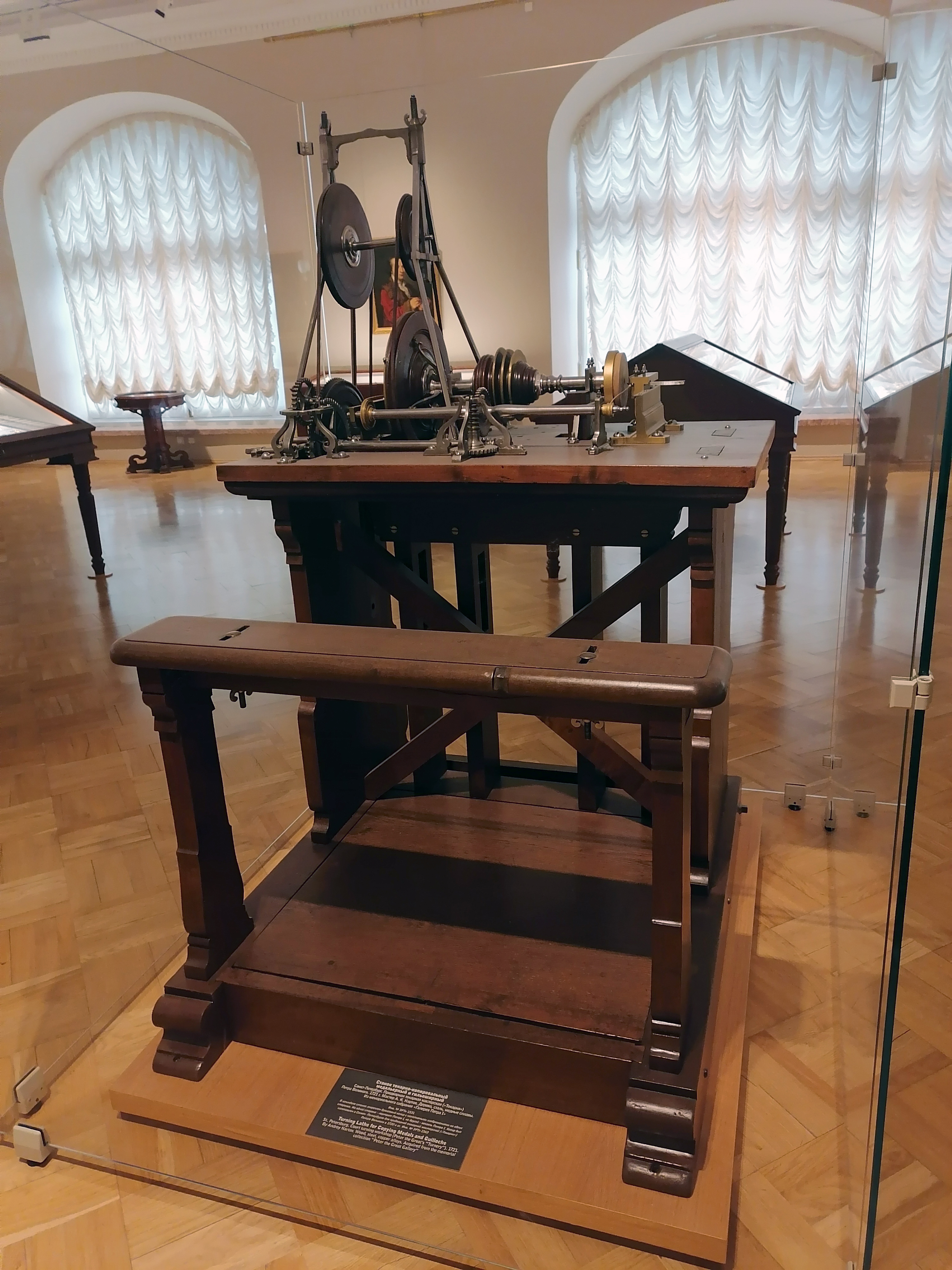
Nartov's copying lathe

In early 1700s Russian engineer Andrey Nartov invented a copying lathe for the purpose of ornamental turning, which allowed the operator to make ornaments with the same precision as that of handicraft work of that time. The Hermitage Museum, Russia, displays the Nartov's copying lathe used for ornamental turning: making medals and guilloche patterns designed by Nartov in 1721. Nartov's lathe duplicated the pattern from a template to a blank, cutting to the preset scale. A probe traced the template and the cutter cut accordingly. The cutter was set on the same axis as the probe, but was controlled by the screw with the smaller step, which ensured the scaling. It could cut minute detail, but worked very slowly. The duplicating lathe, as well as other machinery of Nartov's invention was described, with diagrams, in Nartov's unpublished manuscript, Theatrum Machinarium. It was found and published, in Russian and English, in 1960s.

=== Blanchard lathe ===
The Blanchard lathe, invented by Thomas Blanchard, revolutionized the process of gun stock making in the 1820s, after it was invented. Blanchard's copying lathe traced a model to turn gun stocks, producing the desired contour automatically. Originally used for gun stocks, it was subsequently used for numerous objects of irregular shape: piano legs, wig stands, shoe lasts, etc. In Blanchard's copying lathe a rotating template controlled the cutter which cut the blank rotated in unison with the pattern, while the pattern tracer and the cutter moved along the horizontal axis.

== Bibliography ==
- Hounshell, David A. (1984), From the American System to Mass Production, 1800–1932: The Development of Manufacturing Technology in the United States, Baltimore, Maryland: Johns Hopkins University Press, ISBN 978-0-8018-2975-8, LCCN 83016269, OCLC 1104810110
