= Thomas Blanchard (inventor) =

American inventor

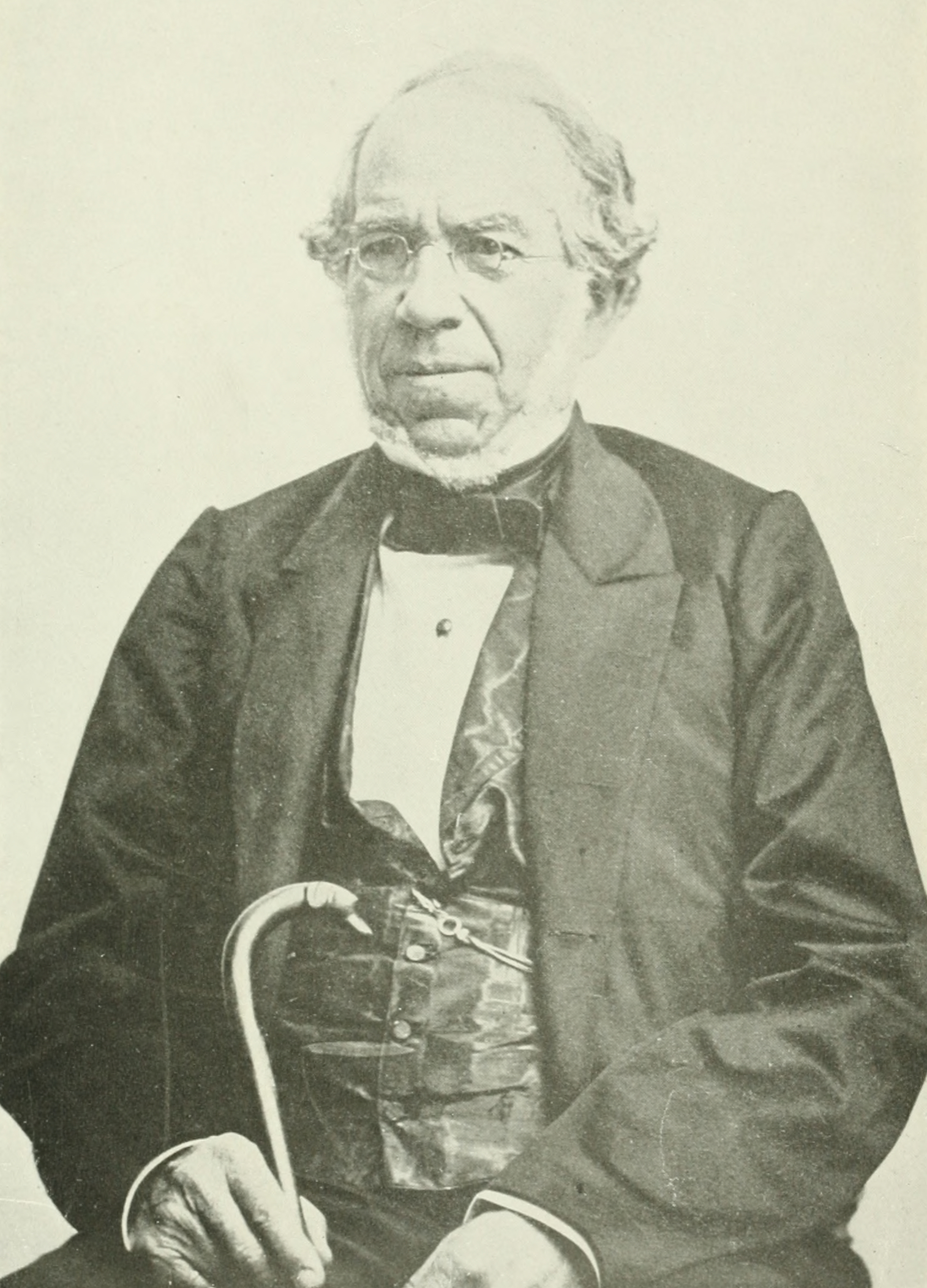
- Blanchard in his later years
- Born: June 24, 1788; Sutton, Massachusetts, US
- Died: April 16, 1864 (aged 75); Springfield, Massachusetts, US
- Occupation: inventor

Thomas Blanchard (June 24, 1788 – April 16, 1864) was an American inventor who lived much of his life in Springfield, Massachusetts, where, in 1819, he pioneered the assembly line style of mass production in America and also invented the first machining lathe for interchangeable parts. Blanchard worked, for much of his career, with the Springfield Armory. In 1825, Blanchard also invented America's first car, which he called a "horseless carriage," powered by steam. During Blanchard's lifetime, he was awarded over twenty-five patents for his creations.

== Biography ==
=== Tacks ===
He was born in Sutton, Massachusetts. He had a fondness for mechanical employment and was associated with his brother in the manufacture of tacks by hand. This process was exceedingly slow and tedious, and his first machine, made and patented in 1806, was a mechanical tack-maker, which could fabricate five hundred tacks per minute, each much better than tacks made by hand. He sold the rights to his machine for $5,000.

=== Machine tools for gun making and pattern-copying lathe ===
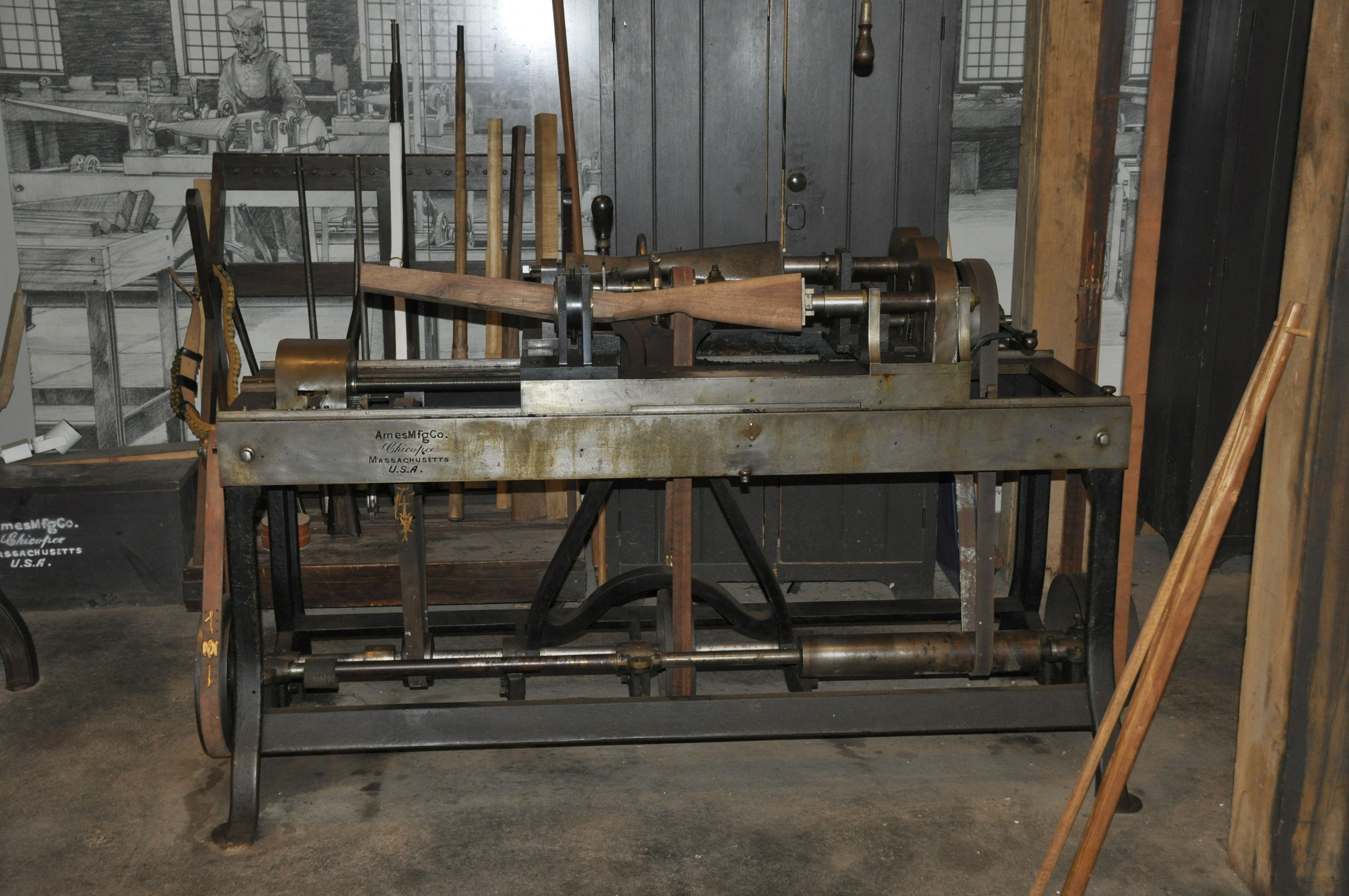
Water-powered Blanchard lathe used for duplicating gun stocks from the 1850s (Harpers Ferry Armory)

Blanchard then turned his attention to gun barrels and invented a machine tool that streamlined the process of their manufacture. Hired by the Springfield Armory during its construction, Blanchard finished the machine in 1822. The machine turned and finished gun barrels in a single operation; the octagon portion of the barrel was finished by changing the action of the lathe to vibratory motion. This invention was afterward extended to the turning of all kinds of irregular forms.

He also developed a copying lathe that traced a model to turn gun stocks, producing the desired contour automatically (1818). The copying lathe began being used to make shoe lasts (forms) in the 1850s. By being able to accurately reproduce lasts, it was possible to make shoes in standard sizes.

=== Steam transportation ===
Turning his attention to transportation, Blanchard invented a "steam wagon" before the introduction of railroads in the United States, and, in 1831, created a powerful upriver steamboat that was used on the Connecticut River and the West, both of which he invented and patented in Springfield, Massachusetts. In 1851, he designed and created a machine that could bend dense and strong wood.

Blanchard also constructed machines for cutting and folding envelopes in a single operation and several mortising machines.

== Patents ==
- X0002080 Horizontal shearing machine, May 4, 1813 (patent destroyed by fire)
- X0003010 Machine for tacks and brads, October 3, 1817 (patent destroyed by fire)
- X0003131 Turning irregular forms (image only, no text) (patented September 6, 1819)
- X0003436 Machine for turning gun stocks, September 6, 1819 (patent destroyed by fire)
- X0004832 Regulating the speed of carriages, December 28, 1825 (patent destroyed by fire)
- U.S. patent 3 Machine for turning, &c., wooden sheaves and pins for ships' tackle-blocks and pulleys (dated August 1, 1836)
- U.S. patent 4 Stock shaving or rounding machine for edges, ends, &c., of ships' tackle-blocks (dated August 10, 1836)
- U.S. patent 5 Machine for mortising solid wooden shells of ships' tackle-blocks (dated August 10, 1836)
- U.S. patent 6 Machine for forming end pieces of plank blocks for ships, &c. (dated August 10, 1836)
- U.S. patent 7 Machine for boring holes and cutting lanyard-scores in deadeyes (dated August 10, 1836)
- U.S. patent 8 Machine for cutting scores round ships' tackle-blocks and dead-eyes (dated August 10, 1836)
- U.S. patent 9 Method of riveting plank or made blocks (dated August 10, 1836)

== Bibliography ==
- Goddard, Dwight (2008) [1906], Eminent Engineers, BiblioBazaar, LLC, pp. 70–77, ISBN 978-0-559-68546-0
- Hounshell, David A. (1984), From the American System to Mass Production, 1800–1932: The Development of Manufacturing Technology in the United States, Baltimore, Maryland: Johns Hopkins University Press, ISBN 978-0-8018-2975-8, LCCN 83016269, OCLC 1104810110
- Iles, George (1912), Leading American Inventors, New York: Henry Holt and Company, pp. 104–109
- "Death of a Distinguished Inventor", New York Times, April 24, 1864
- Wilson, J. G.; Fiske, J., eds. (1900). "Blanchard, Thomas" . Appletons' Cyclopædia of American Biography. New York: D. Appleton.
- Waters, Asa H. (1878), Biographical Sketch of Thomas Blanchard and his inventions, Worcester, Massacheusetts: L.P. Goddard, OCLC 40794466
