= Potter's wheel =

Machine used in the shaping of round ceramic ware

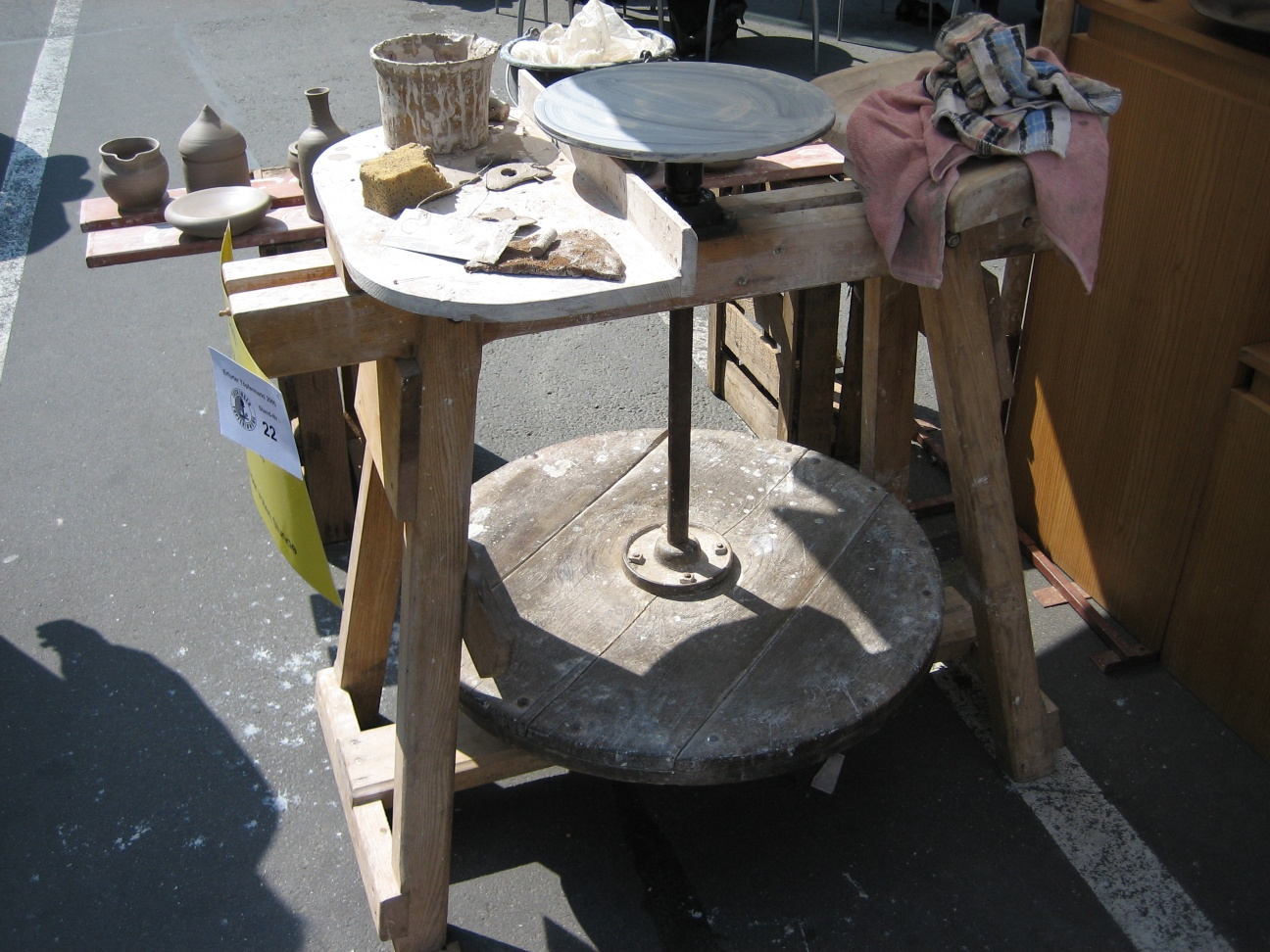
Classic potter's kick-wheel in Erfurt, Germany

In pottery, a potter's wheel is a machine used in the shaping (known as throwing) of clay into round ceramic ware. The wheel may also be used during the process of trimming excess clay from leather-hard dried ware that is stiff but malleable, and for applying incised decoration or rings of colour. Use of the potter's wheel became widespread throughout the Old World but was unknown in the Pre-Columbian New World, where pottery was handmade by methods that included coiling and beating.

A potter's wheel may occasionally be referred to as a "potter's lathe". However, that term is better used for another kind of machine that is used for a different shaping process, turning, similar to that used for shaping of metal and wooden articles. The pottery wheel is an important component to create arts and craft products.

The techniques of jiggering and jolleying can be seen as extensions of the potter's wheel: in jiggering, a shaped tool is slowly brought down onto the plastic clay body that has been placed on top of the rotating plaster mould. The jigger tool shapes one face, the mould the other. The term is specific to the shaping of flat ware, such as plates, whilst a similar technique, jolleying, refers to the production of hollow ware, such as cups.

== History ==
A graphic representation of a primitive rotating pottery wheel made of clay and positioned on the ground, based on archaeological finds in Romania

A graphic depiction of an ancient potter's wheel proposed by archaeologist Ștefan Cucoș, based on the findings in Valeni, Feliceni and Ghelăiești in Romania

Prior to using a wheel, all of these civilizations used techniques such as pinching, coiling, paddling, and shaping to create ceramic forms. In addition, several of these techniques continued to be used on pots on or off the wheel to decorate or create more rounded or symmetrical shapes.

Most early ceramic ware was hand-built using a simple coiling technique in which clay was rolled into long threads that were then pinched and smoothed together to form the body of a vessel. In the coiling method of construction, all the energy required to form the main part of a piece is supplied indirectly by the hands of the potter. Early ceramics built by coiling were often placed on mats or large leaves to allow them to be worked more conveniently. The evidence of this lies in mat or leaf impressions left in the clay of the base of the pot. This arrangement allowed the potter to rotate the vessel during construction, rather than walk around it to add coils of clay.

The oldest forms of the potter's wheel (called tourneys or slow wheels) were probably developed as an extension to this procedure. Tournettes, in use around 3500 BC in the Near East, were turned slowly by hand or by foot while coiling a pot. Only a small range of vessels were fashioned on the tournette, suggesting that it was used by a limited number of potters. The introduction of the slow wheel increased the efficiency of hand-powered pottery production.

In the mid to late 3rd millennium BC the fast wheel was developed, which operated on the flywheel principle. It utilised energy stored in the rotating mass of the heavy stone wheel itself to speed the process. This wheel was wound up and charged with energy by kicking, or pushing it around with a stick, providing angular momentum. The fast wheel enabled a new process of pottery-making to develop, called throwing, in which a lump of clay was placed centrally on the wheel and then squeezed, lifted and shaped as the wheel turned. The process tends to leave rings on the inside of the pot and can be used to create thinner-walled pieces and a wider variety of shapes, including stemmed vessels, so wheel-thrown pottery can be distinguished from handmade. Potters could now produce many more pots per hour, a first step towards industrialization.

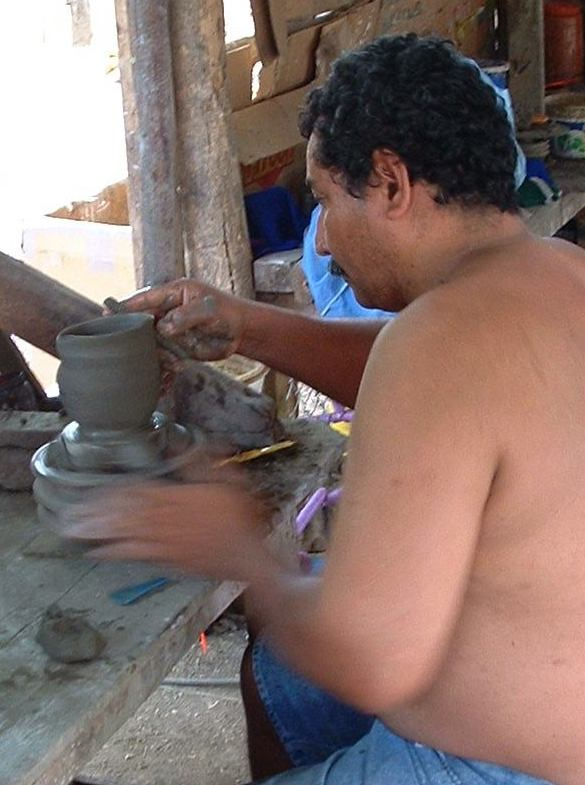
Potter in Guatil, Costa Rica, using a hand-powered wheel, 2003

Many modern scholars suggest that the potter's wheel was first developed by the ancient Sumerians in Mesopotamia. A stone potter's wheel found at the Sumerian city of Ur in modern-day Iraq and Parthia has been dated to about 3129 BC, but fragments of wheel-thrown pottery of an even earlier date have been recovered in the same area. However, southeastern Europe and China have also been claimed as possible places of origin. A potter's wheel in western Ukraine, from the Cucuteni–Trypillia culture, has been dated to the middle of the 5th millennium BC, and is the oldest ever found, and which further precedes the earliest use of the potter's wheel in Mesopotamia by several hundred years. On the other hand, Egypt is considered as "being the place of origin of the potter's wheel. It was here that the turntable shaft was lengthened about 3000 BC and a flywheel added. The flywheel was kicked and later was moved by pulling the edge with the left hand while forming the clay with the right. This led to the counterclockwise motion for the potter's wheel which is almost universal." Thus, the exact origin of the wheel is not wholly clear yet.

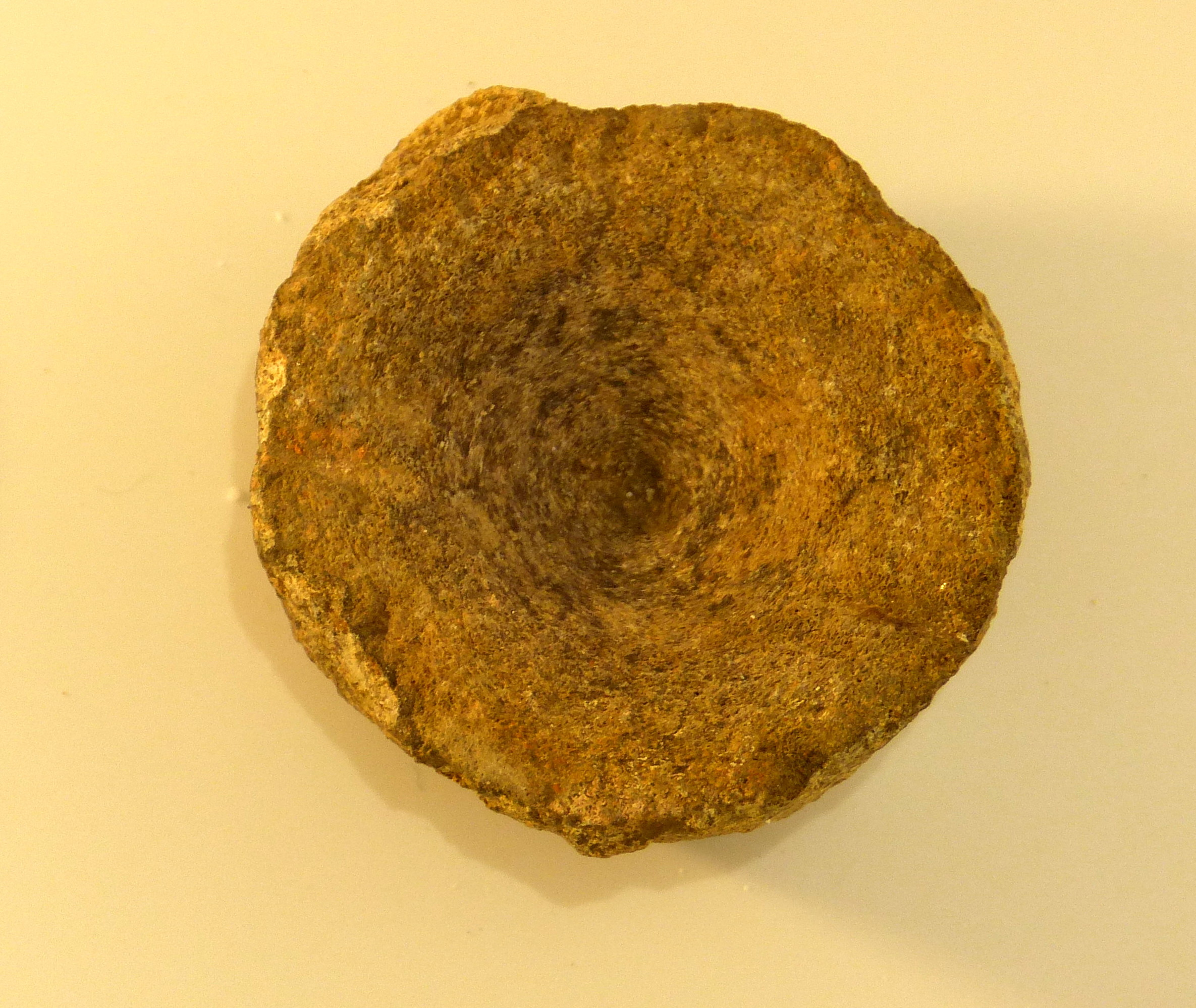
Pivot stone of an ancient Roman potter's wheel, displayed at the Limeseum in Ruffenhofen, Germany.

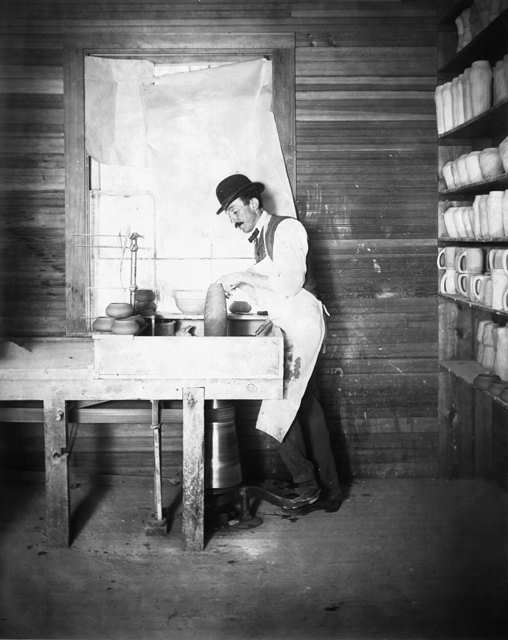
A potter shapes pottery with his hands while operating a mechanical potter's wheel with his foot, 1902

In the Iron Age, the potter's wheel in common use had a turning platform about one metre (3 feet) over the floor, connected by a long axle to a heavy flywheel at ground level. This arrangement allowed the potter to keep the turning wheel rotating by kicking the flywheel with the foot, leaving both hands free for manipulating the vessel under construction. However, from an ergonomic standpoint, sweeping the foot from side to side against the spinning hub is rather awkward. At some point, an alternative solution was invented that involved a crankshaft with a lever that converted up-and-down motion into rotary motion. Archaeological evidence suggests that Roman potters used single-wheel devices that could easily be dismantled and moved, potentially allowing them to adapt their workspace to different areas of production.

In Japan, the potter's wheel first appeared in the Asuka or Sueki period (552–710 CE) where wares were more sophisticated and complicated. In addition to the new technology of the wheel, firing was also changed to a much higher temperature in a rudimentary kiln. The industrialization continued through the Nara period (710–794) and into the Heian, or Fujiwara, period (794–1185). With higher temperature firings, new glazes followed (green, yellowish brown, and white), in addition new styles and techniques of glazing emerged.

Ceramic wares that emerged from China were processed with a very similar beginning as Japan. The history of Chinese pottery began in the Neolithic era about 4300 BC down to 2000 BC. Unlike Japan, which focused on production of everyday wares, China created mostly decorative pieces with few opportunities for industrialization and production of ceramic wares. Because China focused on decorative wares, most of their pottery was centered around porcelain instead of earthen wares seen almost everywhere else, and they used the potter's wheel for the development of porcelain clay culture. Porcelain took off during the Ming Dynasty and the Qing Dynasty (1644-1911), when the iconic blue and white porcelain ceramics emerged. Several places in China mix traditional elements and methods with modern design and technologies.

Native Americans have been creating ceramics by hand and in more modern eras started incorporating a wheel into their work. Pottery can be identified in the Southwest of North American dating back to 150 CE and has been an important part of Native American culture for over 2,000 years. Historically Native Americans have been using the coiling method to achieve their decorative and functional pieces, and the technology to create an electric wheel did not show up until the arrival of Europeans. However, smaller turntables or slow wheels could have been used occasionally.

== Types of wheels ==
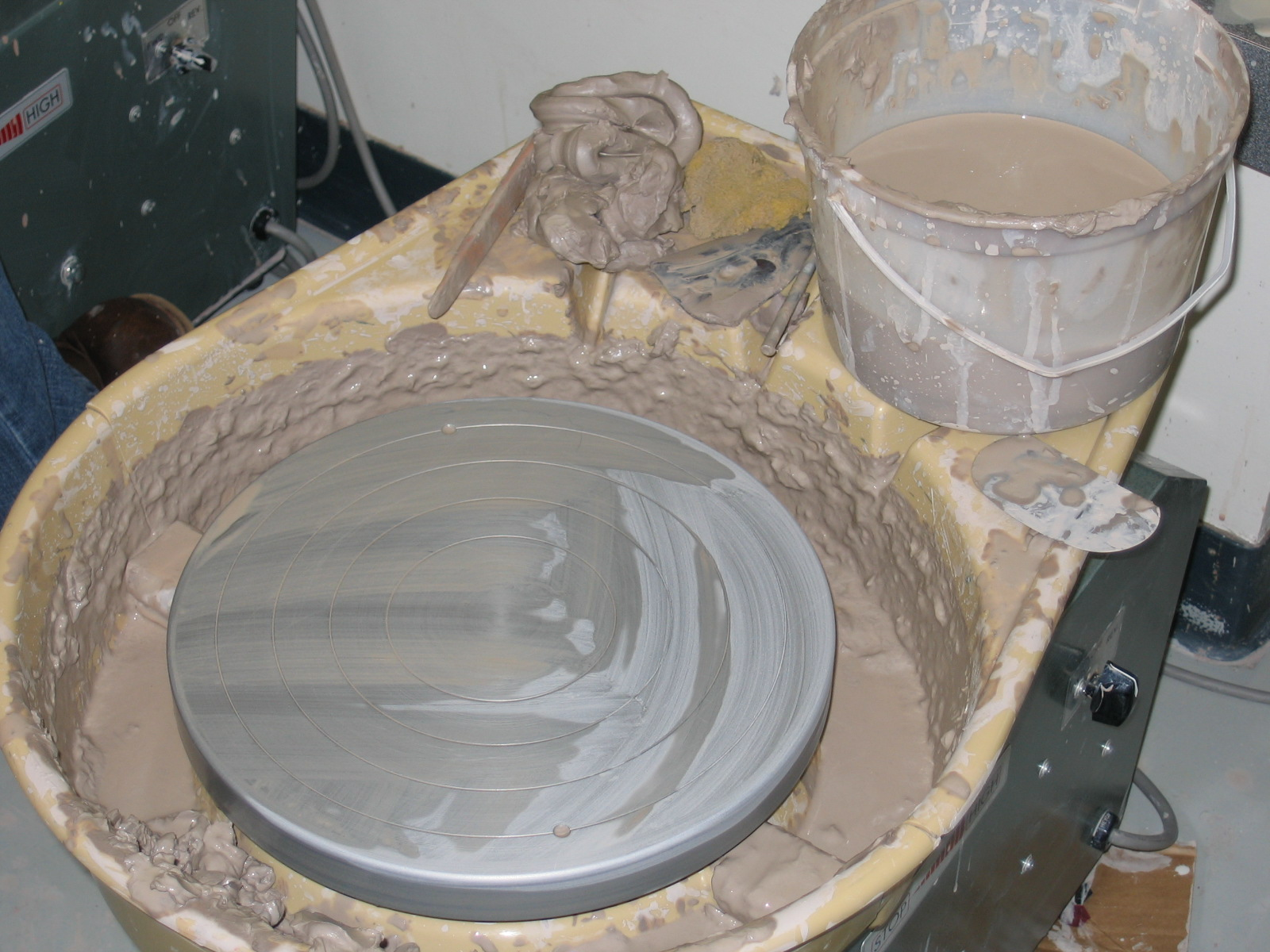
An electric potter's wheel with throwing bucket. The speed is controlled with a foot pedal, similar to a sewing machine.

The use of the motor-driven wheel has become common in modern times, particularly with craft potters and educational institutions. Motor-driven wheels are the most common due to their ease of use, and accessibility. Human-powered wheels are still in use and are preferred by some studio potters. Most of these studio potters prefer these kinds of wheels because they don't use electricity, and the user can choose exactly how the wheel moves so that it's an entirely tactile experience.

== Industrialization ==
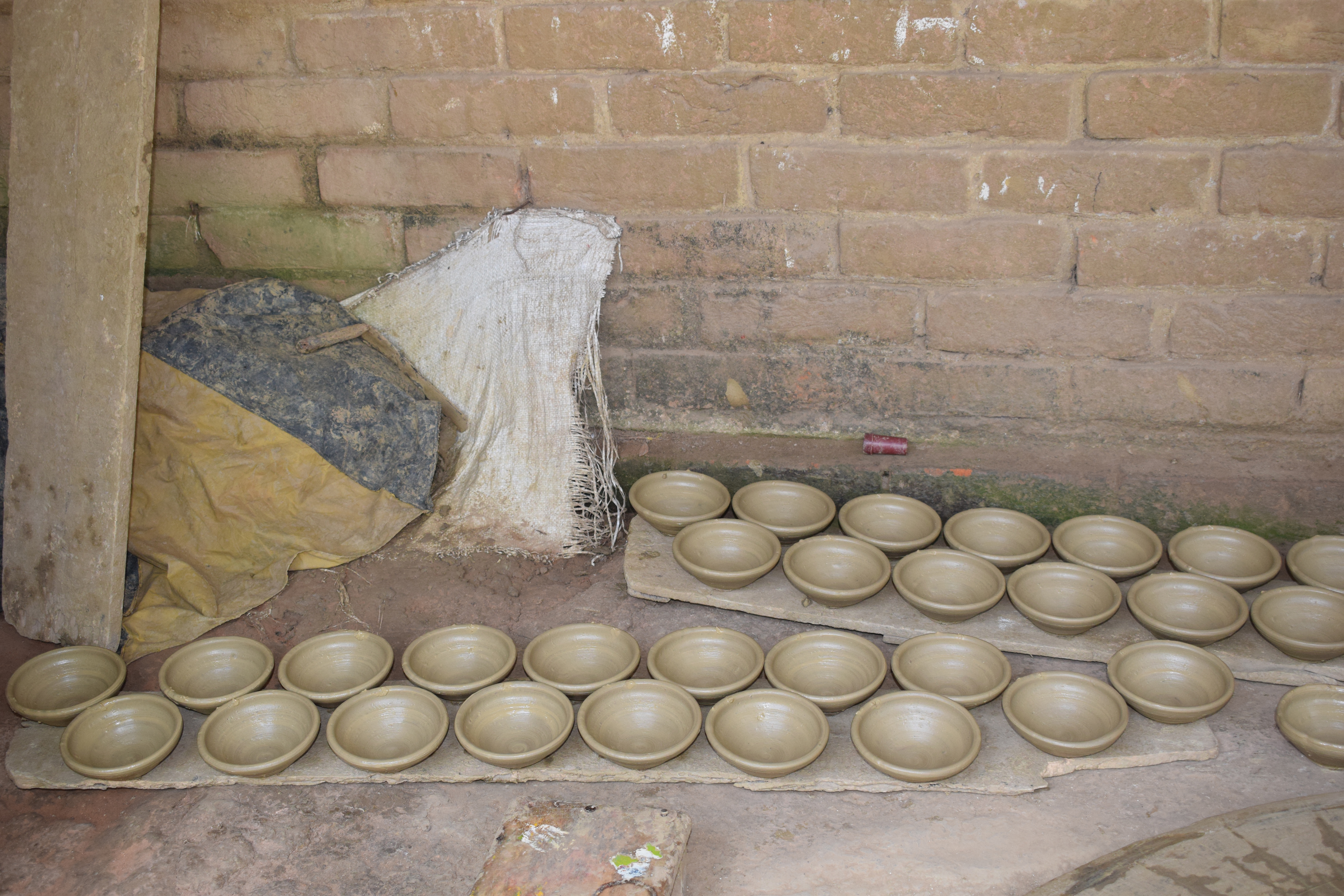
Freshly thrown bowls

Social consequences that can arrive of these technological advancements include increased economic advancements in the sales of pottery created using the potter’s wheel and industrialization of the ceramics processes. The potter’s wheel greatly increased the production rate of ceramics, which allowed for more products to be created. With the industrialization of ceramics in Japan, ceramics also lost some of its historical value, and some techniques and meanings of the ceramics were lost in the process.

== Techniques of throwing ==
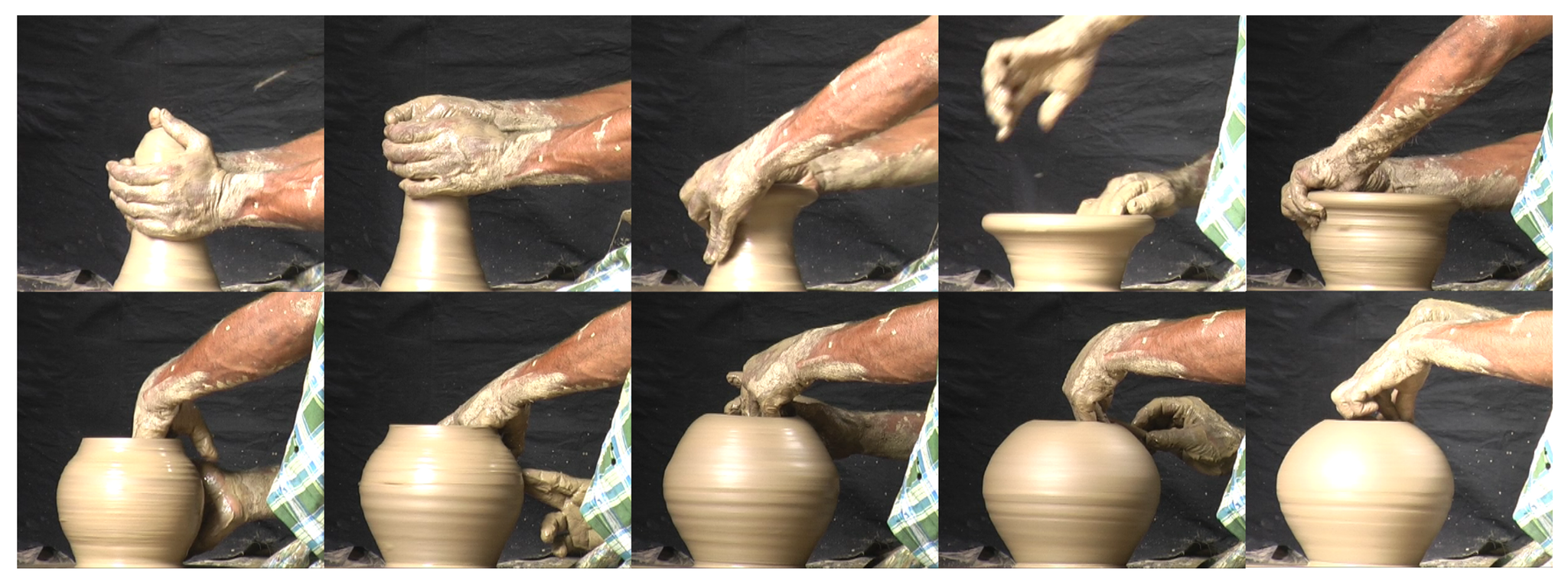
Hand positions used during wheel-throwing

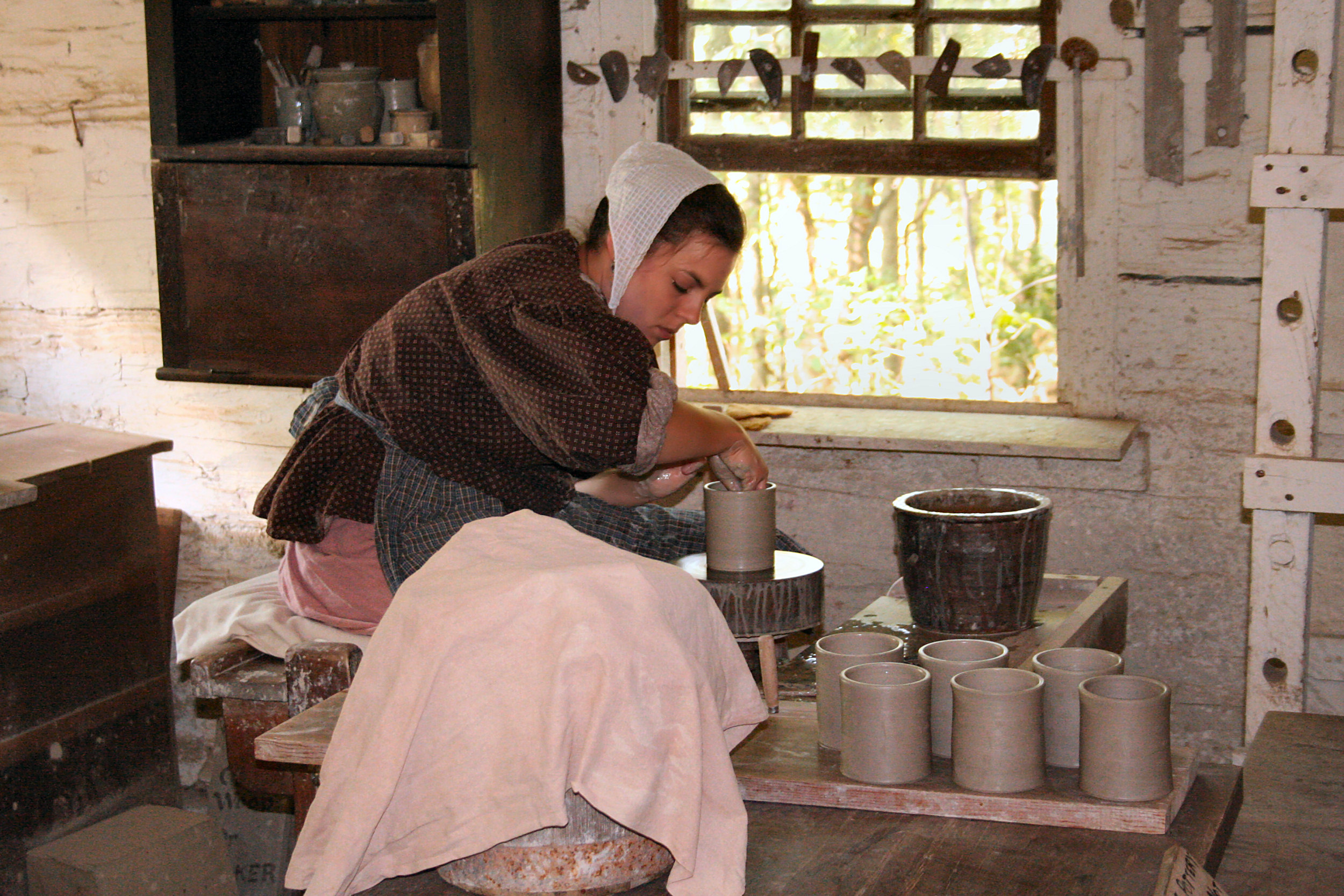
1836 pottery wheel demonstration at Conner Prairie living historical museum

A skilled potter can quickly throw a vessel from up to 15 kg (30 lb) of clay. Alternatively, by throwing a vessel and adding coils of clay then throwing again, pots may be made even taller, with the heat of a blowlamp being used to firm each thrown section before adding the next coil. Similarly, multiple sections may be thrown and combined to create large vessels. Large wheels and masses of clay can also allow for multiple people to work on a pot simultaneously, which can create very large ceramic pieces. This practice is used in Jingdezhen, China, where 3 or more potters may work on one pot at the same time.

There are a variety of methods to throwing, though almost all involve the following steps in some form: center the clay on the wheel, open a hole in the clay, creating a donut shaped ring of clay around the base of the pot, then raise or shape the walls to create the pot's final shape. The specifics of these steps, including the motions of the hands, can vary from culture to culture, as well as from potter to potter. In most cultures, the wheel spins counterclockwise and the right hand is placed on the outside of the pot as it is thrown. Japanese pottery is thrown oppositely, with the wheel spinning clockwise and the right hand on the interior of the pot.

== Personal preferences ==
Modern wheels powered by electric motors often allow for rotation in either direction, allowing the potter to choose which direction works best for their technique, hand dominance and personal preferences. In addition to this, there are many other things people change based on personal preference. For example, some may debate about how much water a potter should use; many believe that using more water is better because it lubricates the clay more, while others prefer a dry clay body. Another way people differ in their methods is wheel direction. While it is more common for right-handed people to throw counterclockwise, some feel it is more natural for them to throw clockwise.

== The potter's wheel in myth ==
In Ancient Egyptian mythology, the deity Khnum was said to have formed the first humans on a potter's wheel.

== See also ==
- Vertical lathe, industrial metal fabrication machine with an operation reminiscent of a potter's wheel
