= Glass polishing =

Glass polishing may refer to:

- the fine grinding of glass by abrasives to produce smooth surfaces or for artistic purposes
- the cleaning of the surfaces of glass objects to rid them of dirt, fingerprints, etc.
