= Tailstock =

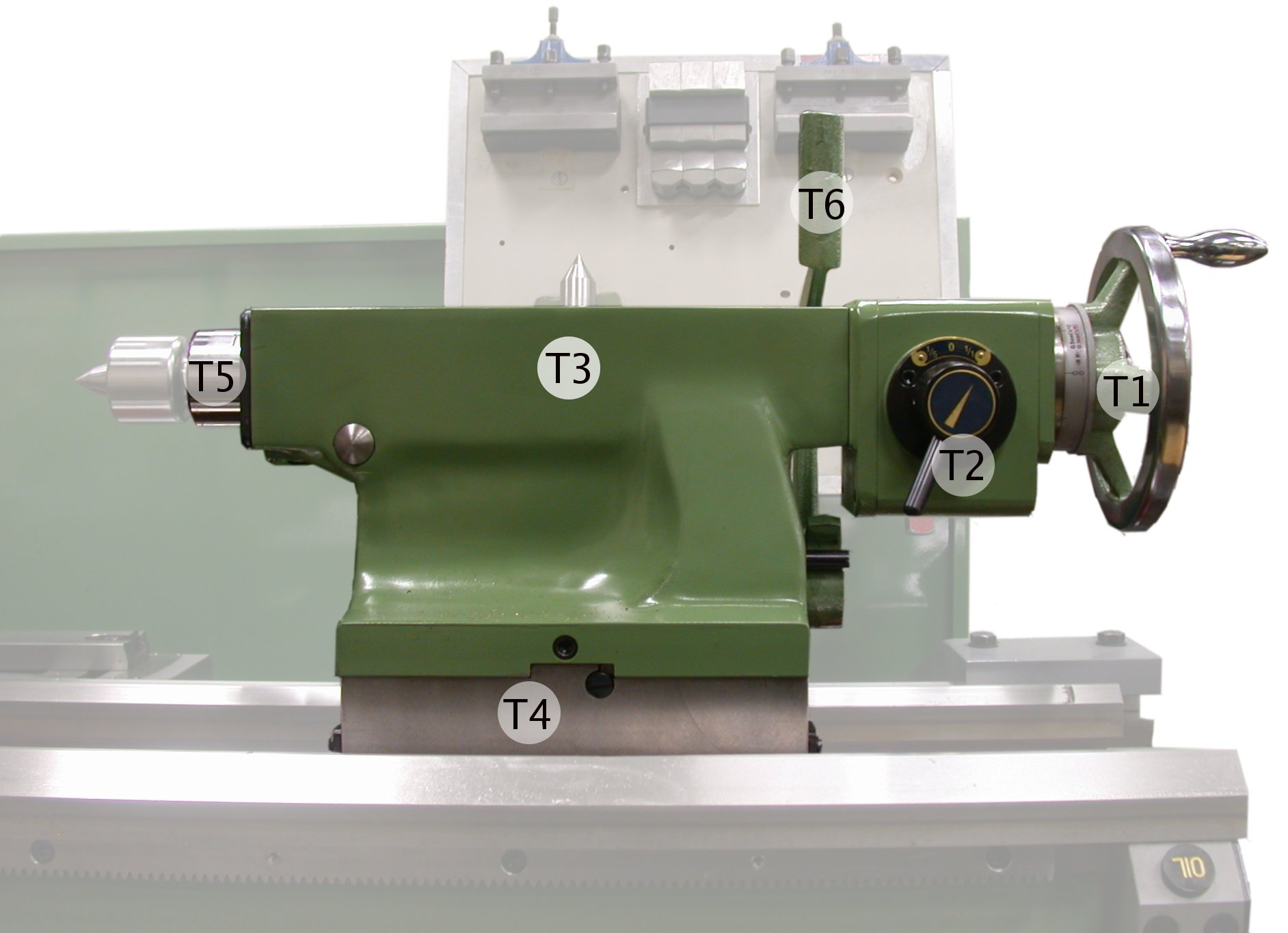
Tailstock, click on image to see naming of parts

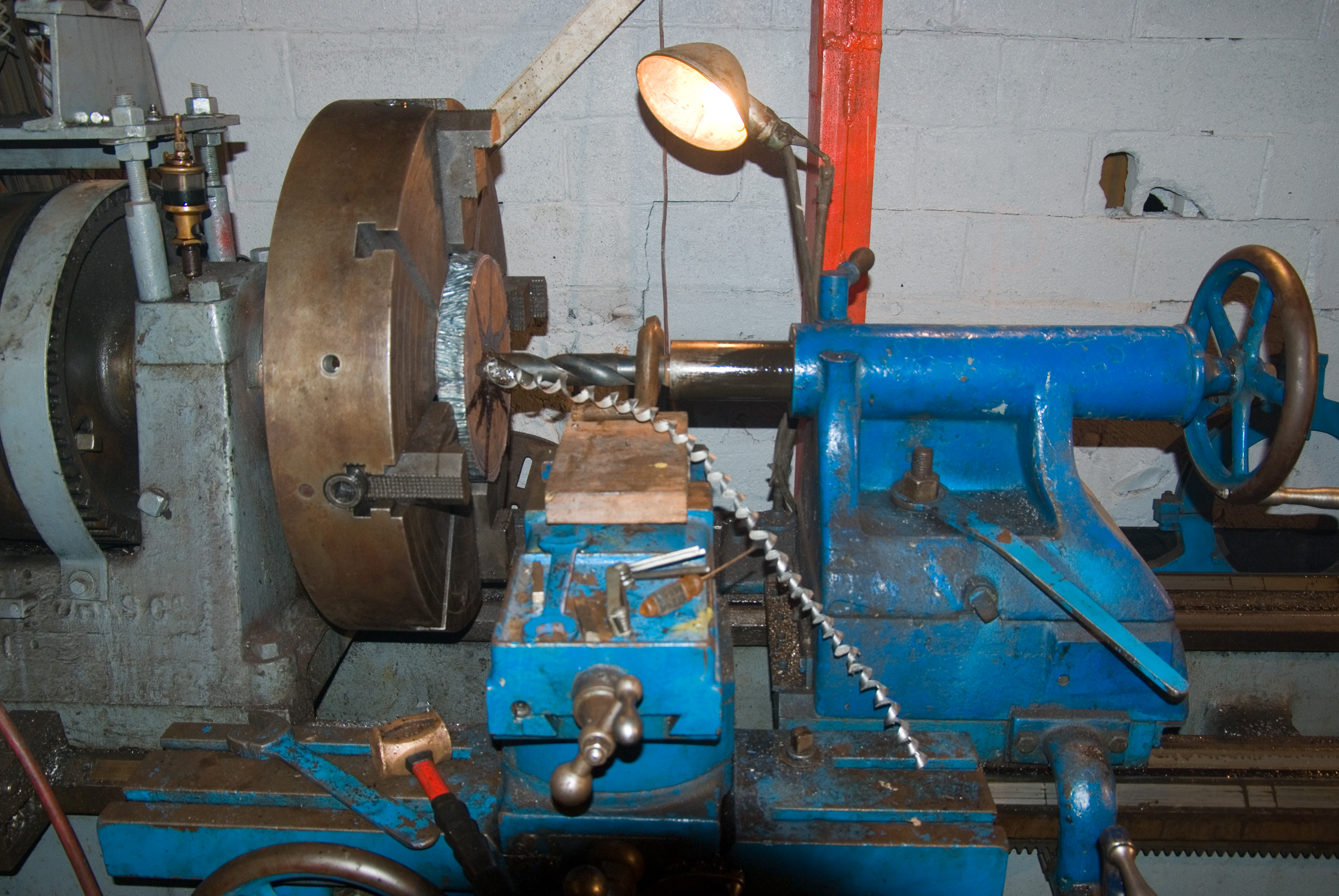
Tailstock used for drilling

A tailstock, also known as a foot stock, is a device often used as part of an engineering lathe, wood-turning lathe, or used in conjunction with a rotary table on a milling machine.

It is usually used to apply support to the longitudinal rotary axis of a workpiece being machined. A lathe center is mounted in the tailstock, and inserted against the sides of a hole in the center of the workpiece. A Tailstock is particularly useful when the workpiece is relatively long and slender. Failing to use a tailstock can cause "chatter," where the workpiece bends excessively while being cut. This bending can also cause finished parts to exhibit an unintended taper where the unsupported end of the part is larger in diameter compared to the end supported by the headstock.

It is also used on a lathe to hold drilling or reaming tools for machining a hole in the work piece. Unlike drilling with a drill press or a milling machine, the tool is stationary while the workpiece rotates. Holes can only be cut along the axis that the workpiece is set to spin.

Usually, the entire tailstock is moved to the approximate position that it will be needed by manually sliding it along its ways. There, it is locked in place and the tool mounted to it is moved with a leadscrew to the exact position where it is needed. When a cutting tool such as a drill bit or reamer is used, the feed is done with this leadscrew. The extendible portion of the tailstock is called the barrel, and usually has a Morse taper mount in the end of it to secure the drill or reamer. If the work is heavy, the drill may be further secured from turning with a lathe dog as shown in the photo.
