= Rulon =

Rulon may refer to:

Persons with the surname Rulon:

- Kelly Rulon (born 1984), 2004 Olympian in water polo

Persons with the given name Rulon:

- Rulon C. Allred (1906-1977), leader of the Apostolic United Brethren
- Rulon Davis (born 1982), defensive end in the National Football League
- Rulon Gardner (born 1971), 2000 Olympian in wrestling
- Rulon Jeffs (1909-2002), leader of the Fundamentalist Church of Jesus Christ of Latter Day Saints
- Rulon Jones (born 1958), defensive lineman in the National Football League
- Rulon S. Wells (1854-1941), general authority of the Church of Jesus Christ of Latter-day Saints

Other:

- Rulon (plastic), a polytetrafluoroethylene-based plastic produced by Saint-Gobain Performance Plastics
- Rulon (film), a 2021 documentary film about Rulon Gardner
- The evil race that wants to rule the universe in the TV cartoon Dino-riders
