= Way (machine tool element) =

Type of linear bearing on a machine tool

A way (sometimes known as a slideway, guideway, or bedway) is a type of linear bearing, specifically a linear plain bearing, in a machine tool. It facilitates precise linear motion along a given axis. A way is ground, scraped, or (less often) molded to be very flat, and ways often come in pairs to ensure a flat plane for the carriage or sliding element (slide) to move along smoothly. Ways are usually lubricated with way oil (a kind of machine oil specially made to adhere to the ways while vertical).

Ways have been used since the 19th century and are a critical part of manufacturing processes, especially those requiring high tolerances such as machining. They have been made of various materials over the years, ranging from wood to cast iron, and nowadays including plastic alloys and special polymer materials. They are crafted with painstaking precision, usually being scraped into near total flatness with hand tools. This flatness is required to both provide good results in the manufactured parts, as well as prevent the stick-slip phenomenon (jerking motion due to friction at low speeds). In recent years they have started to be phased out by rolling-element bearings ("ball" bearings), or are forgone entirely in some CNC machines.

== Materials ==
The material the way is made from has differed and evolved since their invention.

Though ways have also been made from wood, the most common material for ways is cast iron, which provides a rigid and durable base for the ways to be formed on. Ways made from cast iron usually have to be scraped into the final dimensions by hand, which is a long and laborious process.

In the late 20th century, composite materials have started to come into use, such as the plastics Turcite and Rulon. These materials are applied to the ways in strips with adhesive, acting as a sacrificial surface that wears instead of the iron, while keeping the same degree of flatness. The composite materials help to reduce friction between the way and the slide, further reducing maintenance costs and downtime.

== Geometry ==
The geometry of the way can vary depending on the situation. The most common types are flat, vee, and dovetail ways.

Flat ways are used when there is little requirement for the slide to be constrained perpendicular to the axis of movement, or the constraint is being provided by another component or otherwise not needed, such as on the carriage of a lathe.

Vee (V-shaped) ways provide constraint to the perpendicular horizontal axis, but do little to prevent the slide from being lifted vertically.

Dovetail ways provide constraint in both perpendicular axes, and are usually used when the slide is lifted vertically along the ways and must be prevented from falling off. This type usually has an adjustable tightness to the way using a gib-strip (a metal piece placed on one side of a dovetail to tighten the fit).

The precise and accurate geometry of the ways (that is, their shape, size, and flatness) is produced via any combination of milling (for roughing and semifinishing), grinding (for any stage up through finishing), lapping (in some cases, for final finishing), or hand scraping (in many cases but not all), with comparison against surface plates as reference standards for the flatness, as well as any other similar reference standards (e.g., precision cylindrical standards or rings) if concave or convex cylindrical ways are needed.

== Features ==
The ways are often fitted with additional features to decrease wear and ease maintenance.

The way is lubricated with way oil, which is specially formulated to reduce friction, but has an additive that makes it adhere to the ways, even vertically. The oil is applied to the ways with either grease fittings, or is sometimes continuously pumped through ducts machined into the face of the ways. The latter was commonly used on shapers, where the entire way is covered by some part of the sliding element at all times. The ends of the ways are fitted with felt wipers to prevent oil from leaking out as the slide overhangs the ways.

Protective guards are sometimes fitted to prevent metal shavings or dropped objects from damaging the ways.

== See also ==
- Linear-motion bearing
- Plain bearing
