= Graphalloy =

Graphalloy is the trademark for a group of metal-impregnated graphite materials. The materials are commonly used for self-lubricating plain bearings or electrical contacts. They are proprietary materials owned by the Graphite Metallizing Corp. based in Yonkers, New York, USA.

== Construction ==
When the metal is impregnated in the graphite it forms long continuous filaments. These are what gives the material its ductility, strength, and heat dissipation properties.

== Types ==
There are many types of Graphalloy because the graphite can be impregnated with many different metals.

Types of Graphalloy
Type	Impregnated material(s)	Comments
Graphalloy Babbitt	Bearing grade tin alloy and lead based Babbitt	Tensile strength: 5,000 psi (34 MPa). Crushing strength: 19,000 psi (130 MPa). Applications: bearings, seal rings, and contact shoes.
Graphalloy bronze	Bronze	Tensile strength: 5,500 psi (38 MPa). Crushing strength: 24,000 psi (170 MPa). Applications: bearings, seal rings, and contacts.
Graphalloy copper	Copper	Tensile strength: 6,000 psi (41 MPa). Crushing strength: 25,000 psi (170 MPa). Applications: slip ring bushes, bearings, and contacts.
Graphalloy iron	Iron	Tensile strength: 6,000 psi (41 MPa). Crushing strength: 25,000 psi (170 MPa). Application: submerged bearings.
Graphalloy silver 8	Silver	Tensile strength: 5,500 psi (38 MPa). Crushing strength: 24,000 psi (170 MPa). Applications: bushes, bearings, and contacts.

== Applications ==
Graphalloy is used in applications where high and low temperatures are encountered, grease or oil is not feasible, expulsion of wear particles is prohibited, or in dusty, submerged, or corrosive environments. It is non-corrosive in gasoline, jet fuel, solvents, bleaches, caustics, dyes, liquefied gases, acids, and many more chemicals. It is not used in highly abrasive applications. Common applications include bushings/bearings for pumps, bleaching and washing tanks, ovens, industrial dryers, steam turbines, kilns, cryogenics.

It is also used as bearing in applications where electrical conduction is necessary. It is used in when high frequency current degrades ball or needle bearings. Examples of applications include packaging machines, radar joints, and welding equipment.
