= Slide plate =

A slide plate is a linear bearing that may be part of the expansion joints of bridges, high temperature horizontal ducts of water-tube boilers and other mechanical or structural engineering applications. In each case one plate is fixed and the other slides on top as expansion or contraction occurs.

The plates provide a surface with a low coefficient of friction which can be attached to a supporting structure. This combination provides support while simultaneously allowing an object to move (slide) freely along the supporting surface. The plate may be of polytetrafluoroethylene (PTFE), TEF-MET, Lubrite or steel according to the application.

Multiple design variations are possible but the most common example of a slide plate (in structural applications) has glass-filled PTFE bonded to a steel backing plate. In these applications a two-part system is used which has an upper element with stainless steel surface face-down and bearing on a lower element with its PTFE steel backing surface face-up. In most applications, the upper element is larger than the lower element by the amount of movement expected. This has a two-fold advantage of maintaining a constant bearing area and preventing the lower surface from being exposed to dirt, grit or other contaminants throughout the range of motion.

Slides plates are arranged in a 'sandwich' formation, which is made of an upper slide plate and a lower slide plate component.

Commonly used in

- Oil/gas/chemical industries
- Complex steel structures
- Post-tensioned concrete structures

== See also ==
- Plain bearing
