= Frelon (material) =

Frelon is a polytetrafluoroethylene (PTFE) based material with other proprietary fillers to increase bearing characteristics, such as low wear, low friction, and high strength. It is chemically inert and self lubricating. It qualifies as a class III plain bearing. The load capacity of a frelon-lined bearing is typically four to eight times that of a comparable ball bearing; for instance, a 0.5 in (13 mm) Frelon-lined bearing can support the same load as a 1 in (25 mm) ball bearing.

== Characteristics ==
Frelon creates a self-lubricating bearing surface by transferring some of the soft PTFE to the shafting during the running in process. It is almost universally chemically inert; the only materials that attack it are molten sodium and fluorine at elevated temperatures.

It has a plain bearing pressure rating (P) of 1,500 psi (10 MPa); dry velocity rating (V) of 140 surface feet per minute (sfm) (0.71 m/s); and a PV rating of 10,000 psi sfm (0.35 MPa m/s).

Additional lubrication can reduce friction and wear by 50%.
