= Frelon =

Frelon is the French word for Hornet. It may refer to:

- Frelon (material)
- Aérospatiale Super Frelon
- SNCASE SE.3200 Frelon, precursor of the Aérospatiale Super Frelon
