= Babbitt (alloy) =

Tin- and lead-based alloy in plain bearings

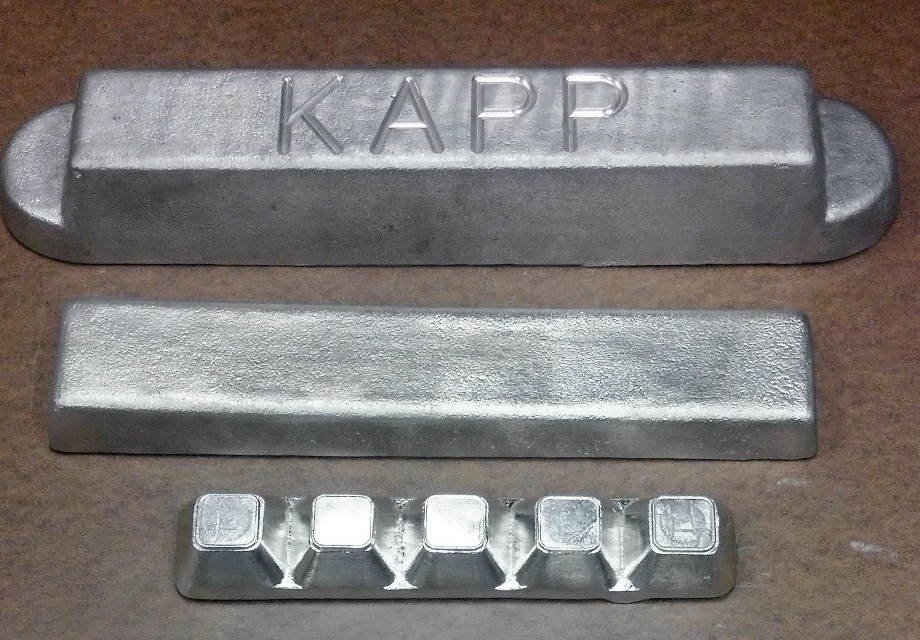
Pigs and bars of Grade #2 Babbitt

Babbitt metal or bearing metal is any of several alloys used for the bearing surface in a plain bearing.

The original Babbitt alloy was invented in 1839 by Isaac Babbitt in Taunton, Massachusetts, United States. He disclosed one of his alloy recipes but kept others as trade secrets. Other formulations were developed later. Like other terms whose eponymous origin is long-since deemphasized (such as diesel engine or eustachian tube), the term babbitt metal is frequently styled in lowercase. It is preferred over the term "white metal", because that term refers to zinc die-casting metal, to lead-based alloys and to tin-based alloys, in addition to bearing metal.

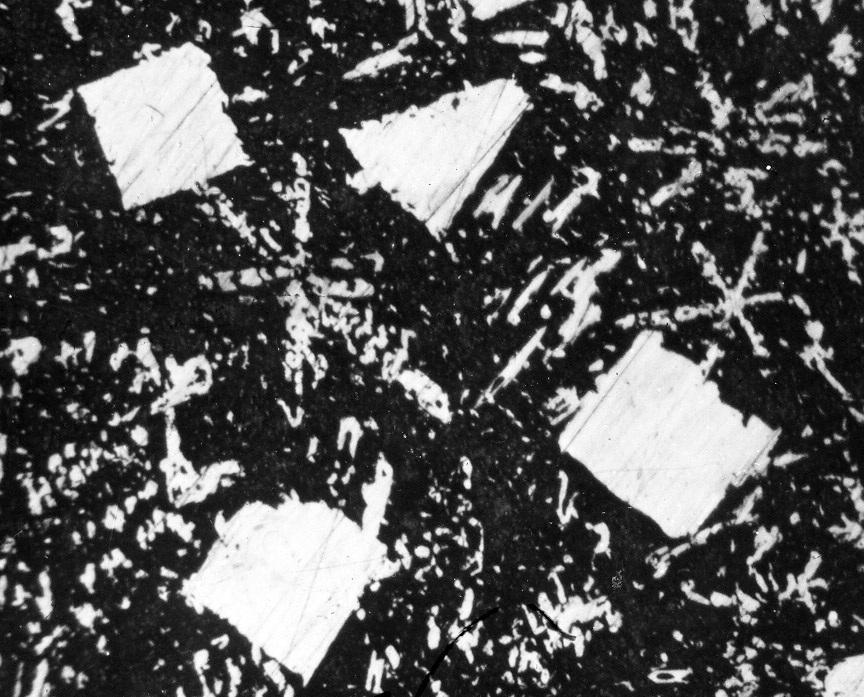
Microstructure of babbitt

Babbitt metal is most commonly used as a thin surface layer in a complex, multi-metal assembly, but its original use was as a cast-in-place bulk bearing material. Babbitt metal is characterized by its resistance to galling. Babbitt metal is soft and easily damaged, which suggests that it might be unsuitable for a bearing surface; however, its structure is made up of small, hard crystals dispersed in a softer metal, which makes it, technically, a metal matrix composite. As the bearing wears, the softer metal erodes somewhat, creating paths for lubricant between the hard high spots that provide the actual bearing surface. When tin is used as the softer metal, friction causes the tin to melt and function as a lubricant, protecting the bearing from wear when other lubricants are absent.

Internal combustion engines use Babbitt metal which is primarily tin-based because it can withstand cyclic loading.

== Design ==
=== Traditional ===
In the traditional style of a babbitt-metal bearing, a cast-iron pillow block is assembled as a loose fit around the shaft, with the shaft in its approximate final position. The inner face of the cast-iron pillow block is often drilled to form a key to locate the bearing metal as it is cast into place. The shaft is coated with soot as a release agent, the ends of the bearing are packed with clay to form a mold, and molten metal is poured into the cavity around the shaft, initially filling the lower half of the pillow block. The bearing is stripped, and the metal trimmed back to the top surface of the pillow block. Solidified babbitt metal is soft enough to be cut with a knife or sharp chisel.

A steel shim is inserted to protect the face of the lower bearing and to space the cap of the pillow block away from the shaft. After resealing the ends with clay, more metal is then poured to fill the cap of the pillow block through the hole in the top of the pillow-block cap, which will eventually become a lubrication port.

The two halves of the bearing are then split at the shim, the shim removed, the oil holes cleared of metal, and oil ways cut into the surface of the new bearing. The shaft is smeared with engineer's blue and rotated in the bearing. When the bearing is disassembled, the blue fills the hollows and is rubbed off the high spots, making them visible. The high spots are scraped down, and the process repeated, until a uniform and evenly distributed pattern of blue shows when the shaft is removed. The bearing is then cleaned and lubricated, and shimmed up so that the shaft is held firmly, but not binding, in the bearing. The bearing is then "run in" by being run heavily lubricated at low load and slow revolution, completing the process of exposing the hard bearing surface. After final adjustment of the shimming, a very reliable and high-load-capability bearing results.

Before the advent of low-cost electric motors, power was distributed through factories from a central engine via overhead shafts running in hundreds of Babbitt bearings. Often, leather, fabric or rubber belts would be used to transfer this rotating power to working machines.

The expression a "run bearing" also derives from this style of bearing, since failure of lubrication will lead to heat build-up due to friction in the bearing, eventually leading to the bearing metal melting and running out of the pillow block.

=== Modern ===
Until the mid-1950s, poured Babbitt bearings were common in automotive applications. The Babbitt was poured into the block or caps using a form. Tin-based Babbitts were used, as they could stand up to the impact loads found on the connecting rods and crankshaft. The poured Babbitt bearings were kept thin. The rods and caps would have shims that could be peeled off as the Babbitt wore down. Ford was known to use two 0.002" on each cap and Babbitt that was 86% tin, 7% copper, and 7% antimony (see the KRW catalogs for the Model T). Steel shims were used, as the brass shims used today tend to compress over time, contributing to shorter bearing life. The poured Babbitt bearings commonly get over 50,000 miles of use before needing replacement. Poured Babbitt bearings are also known to fail gracefully, allowing the car to be driven for extended periods of time. The failed bearing is not likely to damage the crankshaft.

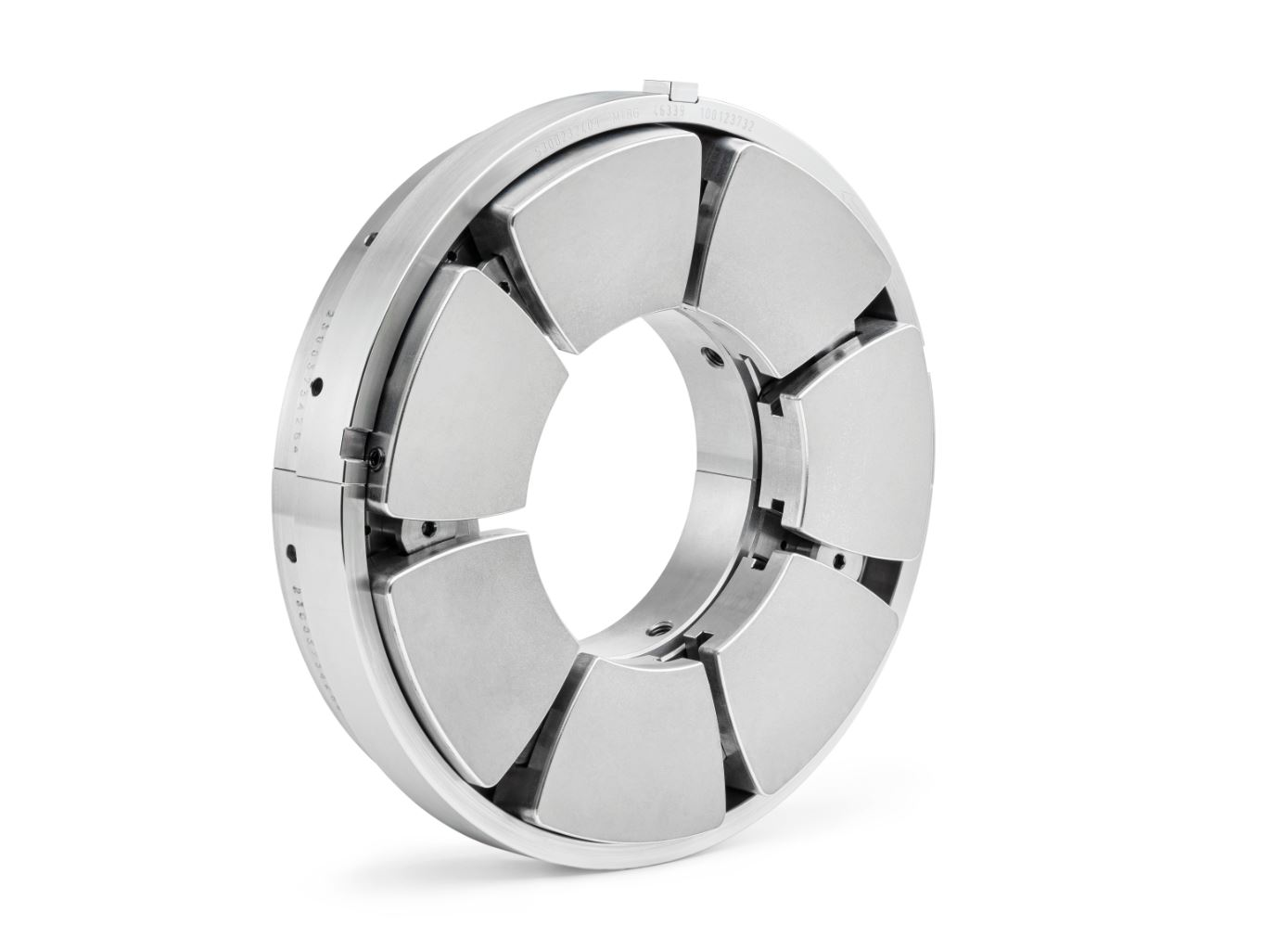
Example: modern Miba Babbitt thrust bearing

The crankshaft and connecting-rod big-end bearings in current automobile engines are made of a replaceable steel shell, keyed to the bearing caps. The inner surface of the steel shell is plated with a coating of bronze, which is in turn coated with a thin layer of Babbitt metal as the bearing surface.

The process of laying down this layer of metal is known as Babbitting.

== Alternatives ==
In many applications, rolling-element bearings, such as ball or roller bearings, have replaced Babbitt bearings. Though such bearings can offer a lower coefficient of friction than plain bearings, their key advantage is that they can operate reliably without a continuous pressurized supply of lubricant. Ball and roller bearings can also be used in configurations that are required to carry both radial and axial thrusts. However, rolling-element bearings lack the beneficial damping and shock-load capability provided by fluid-film bearings, such as the Babbitt.

== Alloys ==
Industry names	ASTM grade	Sn	Pb	Cu	Sb	As	Yield point, (Note: The values of yield point were taken from stress-strain curves at deformation of 0.125% of gauge length.) psi (MPa)		Johnson's apparent elastic limit, (Note: Johnson's apparent elastic limit is taken as the unit stress at the point where the slope of the tangent to the curve is 2/3 times its slope in origin.) psi (MPa)		Melting point °F (°C)	Proper pouring temp. °F (°C)
Industry names	ASTM grade	Sn	Pb	Cu	Sb	As	20 °C (68 °F)	100 °C (212 °F)	20 °C (68 °F)	100 °C (212 °F)	Melting point °F (°C)	Proper pouring temp. °F (°C)
No. 1	1	90–92	≤ 0.35	4–5	4–5		4400 (30.3)	2650 (18.3)	2450 (16.9)	1050 (7.2)	433 (223)	825 (441)
Nickel Genuine	2	88–90	≤ 0.35	3–4	7–8		6100 (42.0)	3000 (20.6)	3350 (23.1)	1100 (7.6)	466 (241)	795 (424)
Super Tough	3	83–85	≤ 0.35	7.5–8.5	7.5–8.5		6600 (45.5)	3150 (21.7)	5350 (36.9)	1300 (9.0)	464 (240)	915 (491)
Grade 4	4	74–76	9.3–10.7	2.5–3.5	11–13							
Grade 11	11	86–89	≤ 0.35	5–6.5	6–7.5							
Heavy Pressure	7	9.3–10.7	72.5–76.5		14–16	0.3–0.6	3550 (24.5)	1600 (11.0)	2500 (17.2)	1350 (9.3)	464 (240)	640 (338)
Royal	8	4.5–5.5	77.9–81.2		14–16	0.3–0.6	3400 (23.4)	1750 (12.1)	2650 (18.3)	1200 (8.3)	459 (237)	645 (341)
Grade 13	13	5.5–6.5	82.5–85		9.5–10.5	≤ 0.25						
Durite	15	0.8–1.2	79.9–83.9		14.5–17.5	0.8–1.4						

In addition to ASTM B23 grades, the British Standard BS 3332:1987 specifies chemical compositions for eight white metal bearing alloys in ingot form, including four tin-based (e.g., BS 3332:1987 Alloy A) and four lead-based (e.g., BS 3332:1987 Alloy G) variants used for casting plain bearings. For example, BS 3332:1987 Alloy A is tin-based with Sn (balance), Sb 7.0-8.0%, Cu 3.0-4.0%, Pb ≤0.35%, and maximum limits of Zn 0.005%, Fe 0.10%, Ni 0.08%, among others; BS 3332:1987 Alloy G is lead-based with Pb (balance), Sn 4.5-6.5%, Sb 14.0-17.0%, and As ≤0.3%. These standards ensure controlled impurity levels for fatigue resistance and embeddability in high-load applications like engines and turbines.

== Alloy selection ==
The engineering of a bearing's Babbitt lining is usually completed during the design of the machine. In selecting the proper type of Babbitt for a particular job, there are a number of factors to take into consideration, the most important of which are the surface speed of the shaft and the load that the bearing is required to carry.

If a bearing is to be highly loaded in relation to its size, then a high-tin alloy is desirable, whereas for much lower-speed work and less heavily loaded bearings, a lead-based Babbitt may be employed and is far more economical.

1. Surface speed of the shaft (the number of feet traveled per minute by the shaft circumferentially):
  Formula: S = π × D × RPM / 12.
  Example: Determine the surface speed of a 2-inch-diameter shaft going 1,400 revolutions per minute (RPM):
  S = π × D × RPM / 12 = 3.1416 × 2 × 1,400 / 12 = 733.04 ft/min,
  where π = 3.1416, D = diameter of shaft in inches, S = surface speed of the shaft.
2. Load bearing is required to carry (the weight which is being exerted through the combined weights of the shaft and any other direct weights on the shaft and measured in pounds-force per square inch):
  Formula: L = W / (I.D × L.O.B.).
  Example: Determine the load on a bearing of a 2-inch I.D. bearing, 5 inches long and carrying a weight of 3,100 lbf:
  W / (I.D x L.O.B.) = 3,100 / (2 × 5) = 310 lbf/in^{2},
  where W = total weight carried by bearing, I.D = inside diameter of bearing, L.O.B = length of bearing, L = load bearing required to carry.

While not subject to precise calculations, the following considerations must also be taken into account:

- Continuity of service
- Bonding characteristics
- Cooling facilities
- Lubrication
- Cleanliness
- Maintenance schedule for the bearing in use

For example, a bearing in continuous use in a harsh environment without regular maintenance will require different Babbitt and lubrication than a bearing in intermittent use in a clean, light-duty environment. This process is essentially the culmination of the technician's expertise and the experience gained from rebuilding the bearing.

If the bearing has performed well in use over many years, then the bearing needs simply to be rebuilt to its original specification and formulation. In this case the technician's greatest concerns are:

1. Bearing shell surface preparation,
2. Bonding characteristics of the tinning compound and the Babbitt layer, and
3. Load bearing surface preparation and finish.

== Eco-Babbitt ==
Eco-Babbitt is an alloy of 90% tin, 7% zinc, and 3% copper that is not technically a Babbitt metal. See Solder alloys for more information on Eco-Babbitt.

== Bibliography ==
- Houghton Mifflin (2000). The American Heritage Dictionary of the English Language (4th ed.). Boston and New York: Houghton Mifflin. ISBN 978-0-395-82517-4..
- Oberg, Erik; Green, Robert E. (1996). Machinery's Handbook: A Reference Book for the Mechanical Engineer, Designer, Manufacturing Engineer, Draftsman, Toolmaker, and Machinist. Industrial Press. ISBN 9780831125752.
