= Oilite =

Brand of self-lubricating bearing

Oilite is a brand of self-lubricating bearing that is made from metal alloys with pores that channel lubricants between the bearing itself and the shaft. It is manufactured from different types of material. Traditional Oilite is mostly made of copper with approximately 10% tin and up to 1% iron, while both Super Oilite and Super Oilite 16 are primarily made of iron with about 20% copper and, in the case of the latter, up to 1% graphite. Oilite is currently a registered trademark of Beemer Precision, Inc.

== History ==
One of the core engineers of Chrysler, Carl Breer, had an idea to pack graphite with metal in 1927, despite the fact that GM earlier failed to make a bushing from compressed copper and graphite. He hired engineer William Sherwood and metallurgist Bill Caulkins, who succeeded in sintering copper, tin and graphite in a furnace without oxygen.

Oilite was developed by Chrysler in 1930, originally as bearings for water pumps and spring shackles, and without oil as the porous filter element in gasoline filters. Chrysler sold approximately 500,000 Oilite bearings in 1930 and approximately 2.5 million the next year. The Super Oilite was introduced in 1932. Overall sales of all Oilite material in 1932 was seven million; this rose to 18 million in 1933. Oilite was a profit center for Chrysler during this time. As of 2009, the Oilite trademark belongs to Beemer Precision.

== Composition ==
Oilite is manufactured using powder metallurgy so that tiny pores are present in the bearings. The pores are then vacuum impregnated with an oil to improve the material's bearing ability. The material holds approximately 20% oil by volume. The most common lubricant is SAE 30 oil.

Due to the porous structure, machining Oilite poses a special situation. To machine Oilite, the cutting tool must be—and stay—sharp; therefore, tungsten carbide is often used. The sharp tool preserves the open-pore structure, because a dull tool would smear the material and close up the pores that are on the surface adjacent to the journal, which is where the lubrication needs to be. Reaming is not recommended, but can be done with an extremely sharp tool. Honing and grinding should not be performed on any surface that is in contact with the journal as these processes always smear the pores.

Chemical composition of various Oilite grades
	Copper [%]	Iron [%]	Graphite [%]	Tin [%]	Other elements (max.) [%]
Oilite	87.2–90.5	1 max.	0–0.3	9.5–10.5	1.0
Super Oilite	18–22	Balance	-	-	2.0
Super Oilite 16	18–22	Balance	0.6–1.0	-	2.0

== Types ==
The different types of Oilite bearings vary by the metal alloy used, not by the type of oil with which they are impregnated. Many types of oil can be impregnated to facilitate various applications, such as high and low speed, high and low load, various temperature ranges, food-grade applications, and plastic compatibility.

=== Oilite ===
Oilite material is the most widely used of all the types of Oilite bearing materials. Standards that encompass the Oilite material are: ASTM B-438-95A Grade 1 Type II, MIL-B-5687D Type 1 Grade 1, CT-1000-K26, SAE 841, and old SAE standard Type 1 Class A.

=== Oilite Plus ===
Oilite Plus is the same bronze alloy as an Oilite, impregnated with turbine oil and fine particles of polytetrafluoroethylene (PTFE). This reduces the friction by approximately 17% versus standard Oilite material. This material is usually used in applications that exhibit mixed-film or boundary condition lubrication. Situations where this type of lubrication is encountered commonly include oscillating motions, slow speeds, intermittent use, pulsating loads, and uneven loads.

=== Super Oilite ===
Super Oilite is an iron-based material that is harder, stronger, and cheaper than Oilite. It is rated for slower speeds, but it can handle higher loads. Common applications include farm equipment, winches, sheaves, conveyors, and pulleys. Applicable standards are: ASTM B-439-95 Grade 4, MIL-B-5687D Type 2 Grade 4, SAE 863, and old SAE standard Type 3.

Super Oilite 16 is Super Oilite that has been heat treated to a hardness greater than HRC 50. This material is used for extreme loads and slow oscillating motions. Common applications include cranes, hoists, machine presses, and conveyors. The applicable standard is ASTM B-426 Grade 4 Type 2.

=== Comparison ===
Physical and mechanical properties
	Oilite	Super Oilite	Super Oilite 16
Density [g/cm^{3}]	6.4–6.8	5.8–6.2	6.0–6.4
Minimum porosity [% oil by vol.]	19	19	15
Strength constant (K)	26,500	40,000	60,000
Tensile strength [psi]	14,000	22,000	32,000
Elongation [% in 1"]	1	1	0.5
Yield strength in compression [psi]	11,000	22,000	40,000

Maximum bearing limits
Material	PV	Static P [psi]	Dynamic P [psi]	V [sfm]
Oilite	50,000	8,000	2,000	1,200
Super Oilite	35,000	20,000	4,000	225
Super Oilite 16	75,000	50,000	8,000	35
