= Pillow block bearing =

Bracket used to provide support to rotating shafts

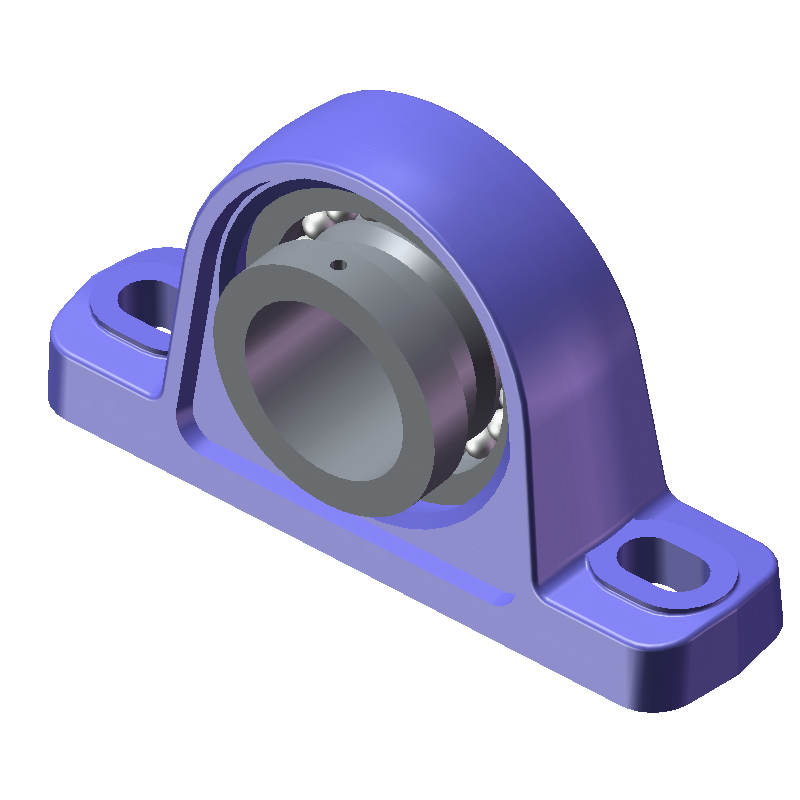
Typical pillow block fitted with ball bearing

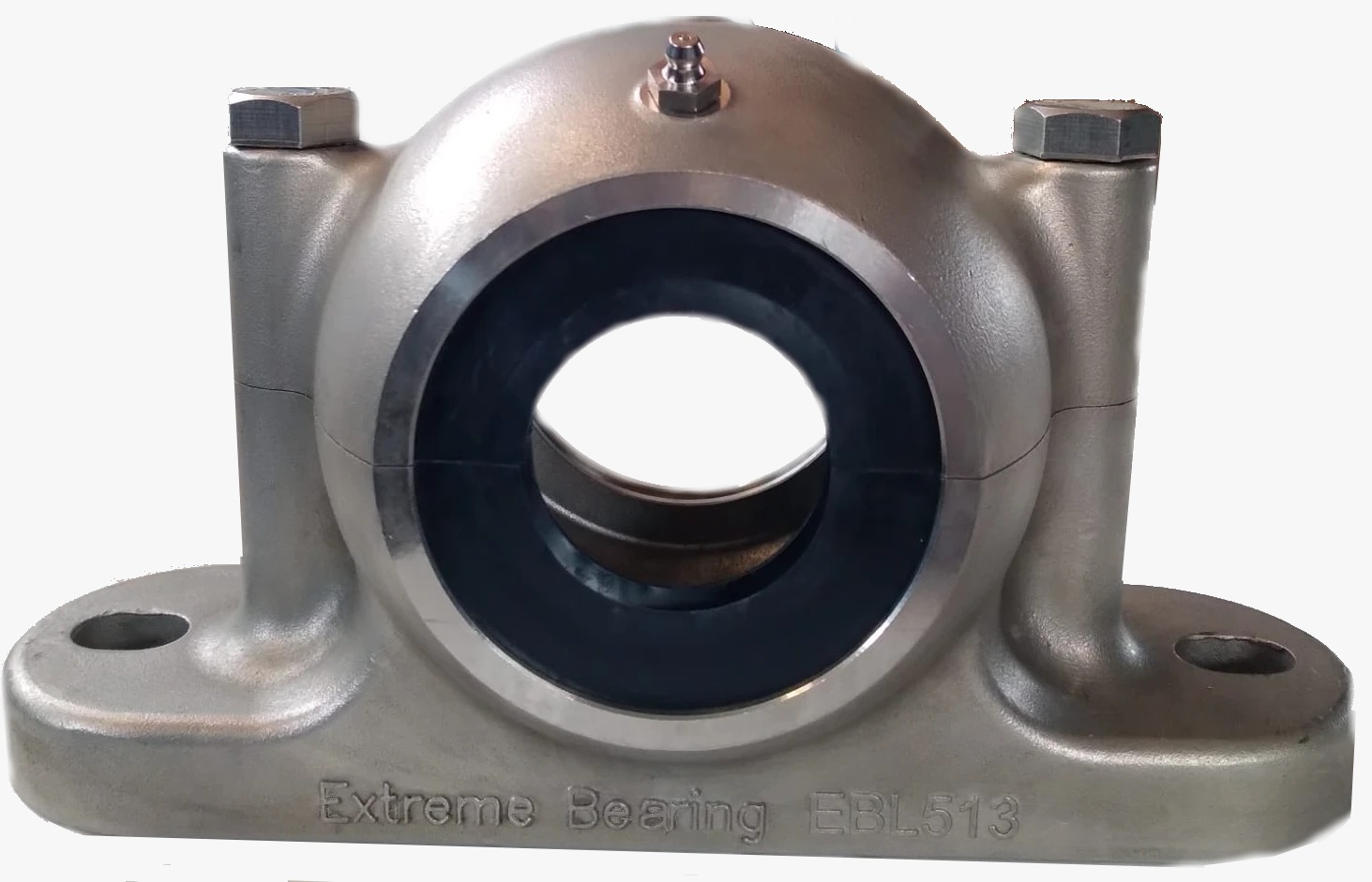
Steel plummer block with water-resistant seals

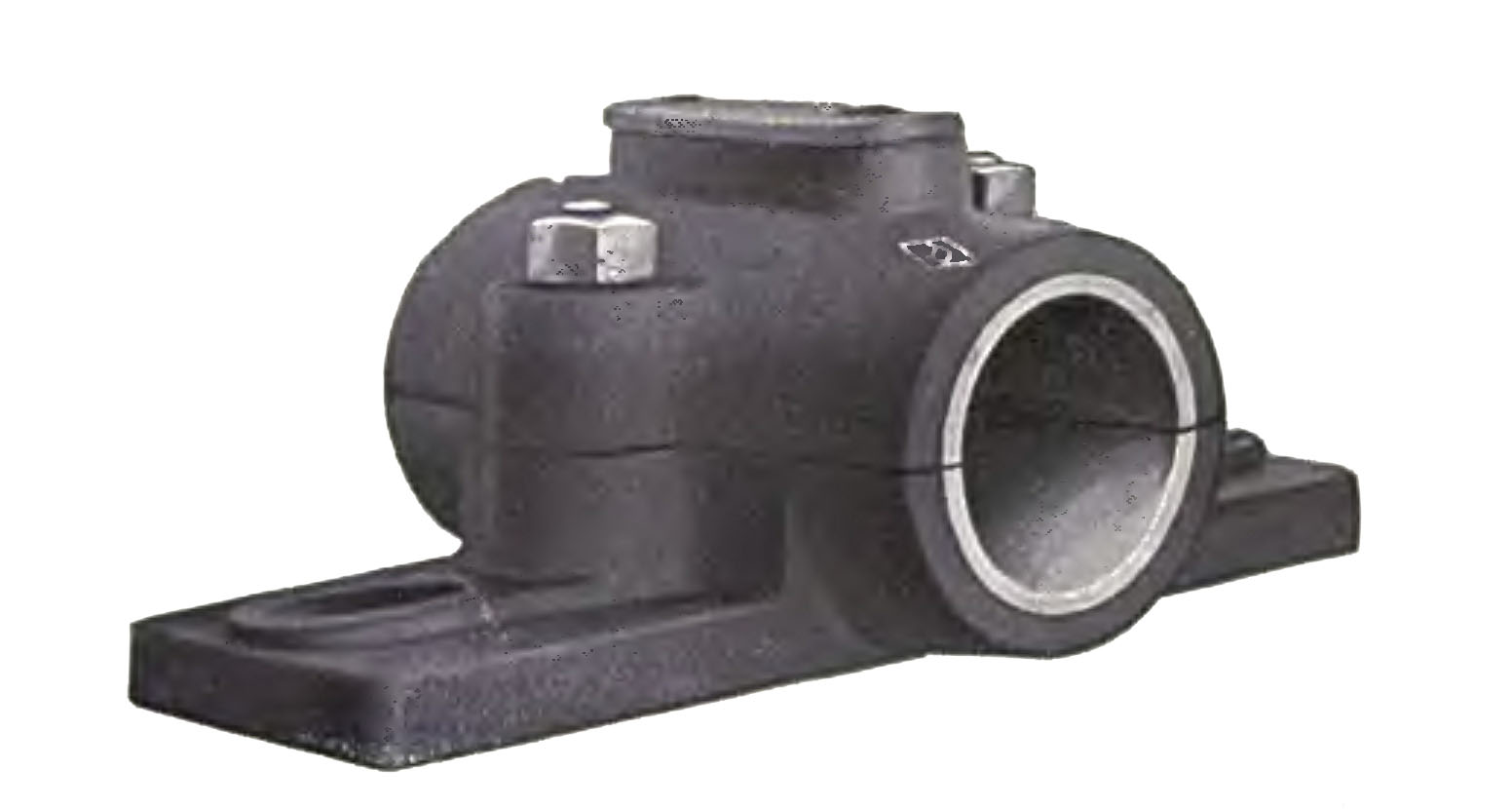
Plummer block with whitemetal plain bearing

A pillow block bearing (or plummer block) is a mounting used to support a rotating shaft, using a bearing in a housing which is bolted to a foundation with the mounted shaft in a parallel plane to the mounting surface and perpendicular to the center line of the mounting holes, as contrasted with various types of flange blocks or flange units.

== Types ==
=== Pillow blocks ===
A pillow block usually refers to a light duty housing, frequently in one piece and often with an integral anti-friction bearing.

=== Plummer blocks ===
A plummer block usually refers to a heavy or very heavy duty housing, always in two pieces. The lower piece is bolted to the base plate or foundation, then the bearing and shaft are rested on it, and the cap is bolted down to the lower piece. Plummer block bearings may be designed for more corrosive environments.

=== Bearing types ===
A pillow block or plummer block may contain a bearing with one of several types of rolling elements, including ball, cylindrical roller, tapered roller, or may be fitted with a plain bearing. Plain bearings for plummer blocks (or two-piece pillow blocks) frequently consist of two thin semi-circular "shells" of white metal which clip inside the two halves of the block. This enables them to be replaced when they wear by jacking the shaft slightly to give access to the bottom half since, for example for a marine propeller shaft, it may be totally impracticable to feed a bearing over the end of the shaft. For very heavy loads, the smaller contact patches of ball or roller bearings would be under excessive pressure, and plain bearings are the only practicable solution. Phosphor bronze or synthetic bushes are often used as plain bearings for light-duty pillow blocks. Occasionally, they too come in two halves to permit replacement.

== Construction ==
Set screws, locking collars, or set collars are commonly used to secure the shaft.

=== Materials ===
Heavy-duty bearing housings are often made of grey cast iron. However, various grades of metals can be used to manufacture the same, including ductile iron, steel, stainless steel, and for lighter duties, various types of thermoplastics and polyethylene-based plastics.

The bearing element may be manufactured from 52100 chromium steel alloy (the most common), stainless steel, plastic, or bushing materials such as SAE660 cast bronze, SAE841 oil impregnated sintered bronze, white metal or synthetic materials.

=== Dust and water protection ===
Various sealing arrangements may be provided to prevent dust and other contaminants from entering the housing. Thus, the housing provides a clean environment for the environmentally sensitive bearing to rotate free from contaminants while retaining lubrication, either oil or grease, increasing its performance and duty cycle.

== Standards ==
ISO 113 specifies internationally accepted dimensions for plummer blocks.

== See also ==
- Bearing surface
- Plain bearing
