= Isaac Babbitt =

American inventor (1799–1862)

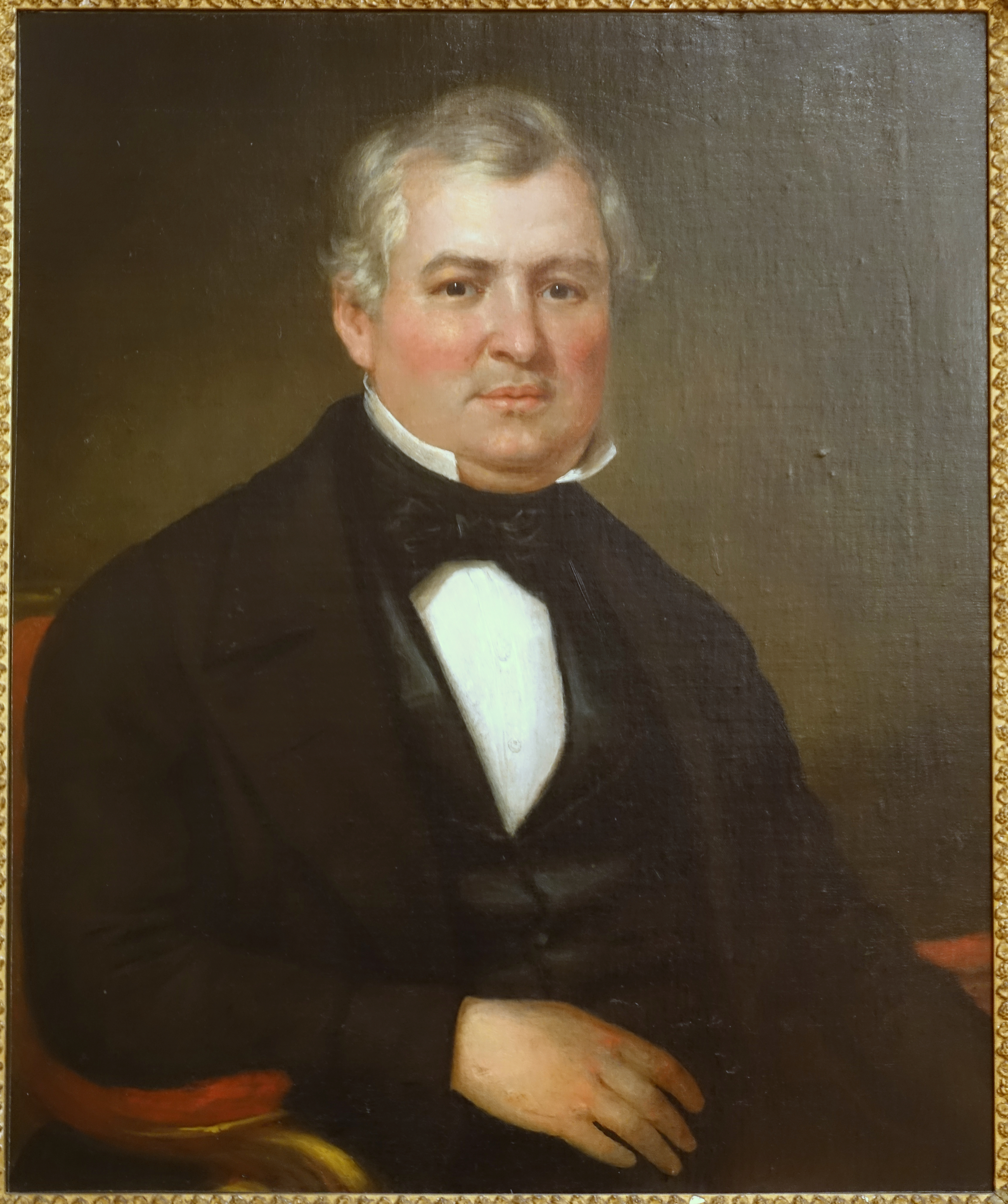
- Born: July 26, 1799; Taunton, Massachusetts, US
- Died: May 26, 1862 (aged 62); Somerville, Massachusetts, US
- Known for: Babbitt metal

Isaac Babbitt (July 26, 1799 – May 26, 1862) was an American inventor. In 1839, he invented a bearing made of a low-friction tin-based metal alloy, Babbitt metal, that is used extensively in engine bearings today.

== Biography ==
Babbitt was born on July 26, 1799, in Taunton, Massachusetts. He was a goldsmith by trade, who experimented with metal alloys. In 1824, he made the first Britannia metal manufactured in the United States, from which he sold table wares as Babbitt, Crossman & Company. As this proved financially unsuccessful, he withdrew, and in 1834 moved to Boston. There he engaged as superintendent for the South Boston Iron Company, better known as Alger's foundries, where he produced the first brass cannon in the United States. Also while there, in 1839, he invented the widely used metal now known as Babbitt metal, an alloy of four parts copper, eight of antimony, and twenty-four of Banca tin, used for reducing the friction of axles in heavy machinery. For this invention he received in 1841 a gold medal from the Massachusetts Charitable Mechanic Association, and afterward the United States Congress granted him $20,000. He subsequently patented this material in England (1844) and in Russia (1847). For some time, he devoted his attention to the production of the metal, and he was also engaged in the manufacture of soap.

He died in Somerville, Massachusetts, May 26, 1862, aged 62.

== Patents ==
- "A Mode of Making Boxes for Axles and Gudgeons", U.S. Patent 1252, July 17, 1839
- "Metallic Hones for Sharpening Razors", U.S. Patent No. 10,5254, May 23, 1854
