= Linear-motion bearing =

Mechanical bearing designed to provide free motion in one direction

A linear-motion bearing or linear slide is a bearing designed to provide free motion in one direction. There are many different types of linear motion bearings.

Motorized linear slides such as machine slides, X-Y tables, roller tables and some dovetail slides are bearings moved by drive mechanisms. Not all linear slides are motorized, and non-motorized dovetail slides, ball bearing slides and roller slides provide low-friction linear movement for equipment powered by inertia or by hand. All linear slides provide linear motion based on bearings, whether they are ball bearings, dovetail bearings, linear roller bearings, magnetic or fluid bearings. X-Y tables, linear stages, machine slides and other advanced slides use linear motion bearings to provide movement along both X and Y multiple axis.

== Rolling-element bearing ==
A rolling-element bearing is generally composed of a sleeve-like outer ring and several rows of balls retained by cages. The cages were originally machined from solid metal and were quickly replaced by stampings. It features smooth motion, low friction, high rigidity and long life. They are economical, and easy to maintain and replace. Thomson Industries (currently owned by Altra Industrial Motion) is generally given credit for first producing [what is now known as] a linear ball bearing.

- Rolling-element bearings are generally designed to work well on hardened steel or stainless steel shafting (raceways).
- Rolling-element bearings are more rigid than plain bearings.
- Rolling-element bearings do not handle contamination well and require seals.
- Rolling-element bearings require lubrication.

Rolling-element bearings are manufactured in two forms: ball bearing slides and roller slides.

=== Ball bearing slides ===
Also called "ball slides," ball bearing slides are the most common type of linear slide. Ball bearing slides offer smooth precision motion along a single-axis linear design, aided by ball bearings housed in the linear base, with self-lubrication properties that increase reliability. Ball bearing slide applications include delicate instrumentation, robotic assembly, cabinetry, high-end appliances and clean room environments, which primarily serve the manufacturing industry but also the furniture, electronics and construction industries. For example, a widely used ball bearing slide in the furniture industry is a ball bearing drawer slide.

Commonly constructed from materials such as aluminum, hardened Cold rolled steel and galvanized steel, ball bearing slides consist of two linear rows of ball bearings contained by four rods and located on differing sides of the base, which support the carriage for smooth linear movement along the ball bearings. This low-friction linear movement can be powered by either a drive mechanism, inertia or by hand. Ball bearing slides tend to have a lower load capacity for their size compared to other linear slides because the balls are less resistant to wear and abrasions. In addition, ball bearing slides are limited by the need to fit into housing or drive systems.

The travelling distance of linear recirculating ball bearings is only limited by the length of their rail, as the balls recirculate inside the bearing's housing. Linear non-recirculating ball bearings have balls installed on a bracket and only move in one axis without recirculation. Since the balls do not recirculate, this type of bearings can provide extremely smooth motion. However, the travelling distance of linear non-recirculating ball bearings is limited by the length of the bracket.

=== Roller slides ===
Also known as crossed roller slides, roller slides are non-motorized linear slides that provide low-friction linear movement for equipment powered by inertia or by hand. Roller slides are based on linear roller bearings, which are frequently criss-crossed to provide heavier load capabilities and better movement control. Serving industries such as manufacturing, photonics, medical and telecommunications, roller slides are versatile and can be adjusted to meet numerous applications which typically include clean rooms, vacuum environments, material handling and automation machinery.

Roller slides work similarly to ball bearing slides, except that the bearings housed within the carriage are cylinder-shaped instead of ball shaped. The rollers crisscross each other at a 90° angle and move between the four semi-flat and parallel rods that surround the rollers. The rollers are between "V" grooved bearing races, one being on the top carriage and the other on the base. Typically, bearing housings are constructed from aluminum while the rollers are constructed from steel.

Although roller slides are not self-cleaning, they are suitable for environments with low levels of airborne contaminants such as dirt and dust. As one of the more expensive types of linear slides, roller slides are capable of providing linear motion on more than one axis through stackable slides and double carriages. Roller slides offers line contact versus point contact as with ball bearings, creating a broader contact surface due to the consistency of contact between the carriage and the base and resulting in less erosion.

== Plain bearing ==
Plain bearings are very similar in design to rolling-element bearings, except they slide without the use of ball bearings. If they are cylindrical in shape, they are often called bushings. Bushings can be metal or plastic, or even air.

- Plain bearings can run on hardened steel or stainless steel shafting (raceways), or can be run on hard-anodized aluminum or soft steel or aluminum. For plastic bushings, the specific type of polymer/fluoro-polymer will determine what hardness is allowed.
- Plain bearings are less rigid than rolling-element bearings.
- Plain bearings handle contamination well and often do not need seals/scrapers.
- Plain bearings generally handle a wider temperature range than rolling-element bearings
- Plain bearings (plastic versions) do not require oil or lubrication (often it can be used to increase performance characteristics)

=== Dovetail slides ===
Dovetail slides, or dovetail way slides are typically constructed from cast iron, but can also be constructed from hard-coat aluminum, acetal or stainless steel. Like any bearing, a dovetail slide is composed of a stationary linear base and a moving carriage. a Dovetail carriage has a v-shaped, or dovetail-shaped protruding channel which locks into the linear base's correspondingly shaped groove. Once the dovetail carriage is fitted into its base's channel, the carriage is locked into the channel's linear axis and allows free linear movement. When a platform is attached to the carriage of a dovetail slide, a dovetail table is created, offering extended load carrying capabilities.

Dovetail slides are advantageous when it comes to load capacity, affordability and durability. Capable of long travel, dovetail slides are more resistant to shock than other bearings, and they are mostly immune to chemical, dust and dirt contamination. Dovetail slides can be motorized, mechanical or electromechanical. Electric dovetail slides are driven by a number of different devices, such as ball screws, belts and cables, which are powered by functional motors such as stepper motors, linear motors and handwheels. Dovetail slides are direct contact systems, making them fitting for heavy load applications including CNC machines, shuttle devices, special machines and work holding devices. Mainly used in the manufacturing and laboratory science industries, dovetail slides are ideal for high-precision applications.

=== Compound slides ===
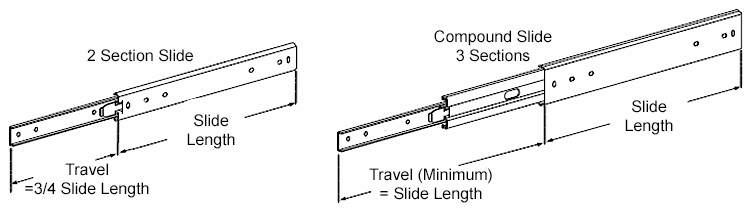
2-Section and 3-Section Compound Slide

Slides can be constructed with two sections or multiple sections. A slide with two sections can only extend approximately 3/4 of the total compressed slide length. A compound slide typically has three sections: fixed, floating intermediate member, and the section attached to the equipment. A compound slide can extend at least as far as the compressed slide length and typically a bit more. In the case of rack slides, this allows the equipment to extend completely out of the rack allowing access for service or connection of cables and such to the back of the equipment.

=== Rack slides ===
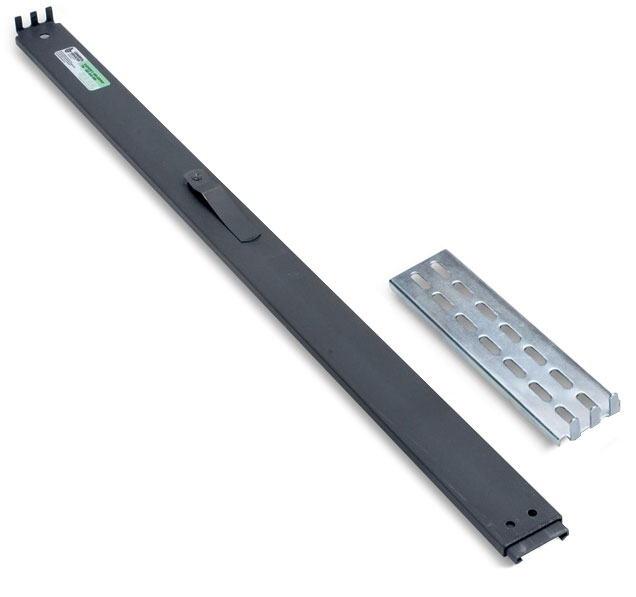
Friction Bearing Rack Slide

Rack slides are specifically intended for mounting equipment into 19-inch racks or 23-inch racks. These can be friction bearing, ball bearing, or roller bearing. They are sized to fit into racks with mounting flanges on the ends to mate to the mounting holes in racks. In some cases, one mounting flange is formed into the rack slide with an adapter bracket attached to the other end to accommodate different depths of the rack. The outer fixed member is attached to the rack and the inner moving member is generally screwed to the side of the mounted equipment. Rack slides are typically compound or 3-part slides allowing full extension of the mounted equipment and generally include provision for sliding the inner member completely free to allow removal of the equipment from the rack. They can also include stops to prevent accidentally pulling the equipment out of the rack without releasing the stop mechanism.

There can be proprietary configurations which, for example, may clip to the equipment without the use of screws or can be clipped into an appropriately designed rack. But the basic geometry is the same regardless of how they are mounted.

== Ball splines ==
Ball splines (ball spline bearings) are a special type of linear motion bearing that are used to provide nearly frictionless linear motion while allowing the member to transmit torque simultaneously. There are grooves ground along the length of the shaft (thus forming splines) for the ball bearings to run inside. The outer shell that houses the balls is called a nut rather than a bushing, but is not a nut in the traditional sense—it is not free to rotate about the shaft, but is free to travel up and down the shaft. For a shaft travel of any significant length the nut will have channels that recirculate the balls, operating in the same way as a ball screw.

By increasing the contact area of the ball bearings on the shaft to approximately 45 degrees, the side load and direct load carrying capabilities are greatly increased. Each nut can be individually preloaded at the factory to decrease the available radial play to ensure rigidity. This process not only increases the contact area, increasing direct loading capabilities, but it also restricts any radial movement, increasing the overhung moment capabilities. This creates a sturdier structure that can handle a very strenuous working environment.

== See also ==
- Ball screw
- Sarrus linkage
- Tool Ways
