= Bearing modulus =

Dimensionless number used in journal bearing design

Bearing modulus is a modulus used in journal bearing design. It is a dimensionless number.

== Formula ==
Bearing Modulus (C) is C = (Zn/p) where

- Z = oil viscosity
- n = speed of rotation (rpm)
- p = bearing pressure(N/MM2)

For any given bearing, there is a value for indicated by C, for which the coefficient of friction is at a minimum. The bearing should not be operated at this value of bearing modulus, since a slight decrease in speed or a slight increase in pressure will make the part of a shaft or axle that rests on bearings operate in partial lubrication state resulting in high friction, heating and wear.

To prevent this, the average value of Bearing modulus should be

- Zn/p >= 3C

or for large fluctuations and heavy impact loads

- Zn/p = 15C (approx)
