= Plastigauge =

Plastigauge is a measuring tool used for measuring plain bearing clearances, such as in engines. Other uses include marine drive shaft bearings, turbine housing bearings, pump and pressure system bearings, shaft end-float, flatness and clearance in pipe-flanges and cylinder heads. Wherever it is required to determine the separation between hidden surfaces. Plastigauge is a registered trademark of Plastigauge Ltd., West Sussex, United Kingdom. Plastigauge was introduced to US retail sales in 1948.

Plastigauge consists of a strip of soft material with precise known dimensions and deformation characteristics. This is sandwiched between a clean bearing surface on a shaft and the bearing shell itself. The plastigauge flattens after the bearing cap is tightened. The dimensional clearance is then determined by comparing the amount that the gauge material has flattened using a template. Letter designation describes the range of measurement use for each gauge.

Table of Plastigauge types
Type	Range (metric)	Range (imperial)
PL-A	0.025mm - 0.175mm	0.001" - 0.007"
PL-B	0.100mm - 0.250mm	0.004" - 0.010"
PL-C	0.175mm - 0.500mm	0.007" - 0.020"
PL-D	0.500mm - 1.000mm	0.020" - 0.040"
PL-E	0.750mm - 1.750mm	0.030" - 0.070"
PL-X	0.018mm - 0.045mm	-
