= Rulon (film) =

2021 American documentary film

- Directed by: Adam Irving
- Written by: Adam Irving
- Produced by: Adam Irving; Diego Hurtado de Mendoza
- Starring: Rulon Gardner
- Cinematography: Travis LaBella
- Edited by: Adam Irving; Fred Koschmann
- Production company: Mandalay Sports Media
- Distributed by: Olympic Channel
- Release date: April 2, 2021
- Running time: 89 minutes
- Country: United States
- Language: English

Rulon (originally titled Rulon Gardner Won't Die) is a 2021 documentary film directed by Adam Irving about Rulon Gardner, an American retired Greco-Roman wrestler. It premiered on NBCSN on April 2, 2021.

== Plot ==
The film chronicles the life and exploits of Rulon Gardner, who was raised as the youngest of nine children on a dairy farm in Wyoming and would go on to win the gold medal in Men's Greco-Roman 130 kg wrestling at the 2000 Summer Olympics in Sydney, Australia. In a stunning upset known as the "miracle on the mat," Gardner defeated Russian wrestler Aleksandr Karelin, who had been undefeated for 13 years. The film also follows the adversity Gardner faced in the years after his Olympic victory, including surviving an amputation from frostbite, a motorcycle accident, a plane crash, personal bankruptcy, and a season competing on The Biggest Loser.

== Production ==
The film is narrated by Gardner, with interview subjects including Aleksandr Karelin, Katie Couric, Bob Costas, and Jim Lampley. Executive producers include Frank Marshall, Mike Tollin, and Jon Weinbach. Gardner said of the film that it is "an honest look at not only the success I have achieved but at the hardships that preceded and have followed my Olympic experience."

== Release ==
The film premiered on NBCSN on April 2, 2021, as part of the Olympic Channel's Five Rings Films.
