= Bearing surface =

Area of contact between two objects

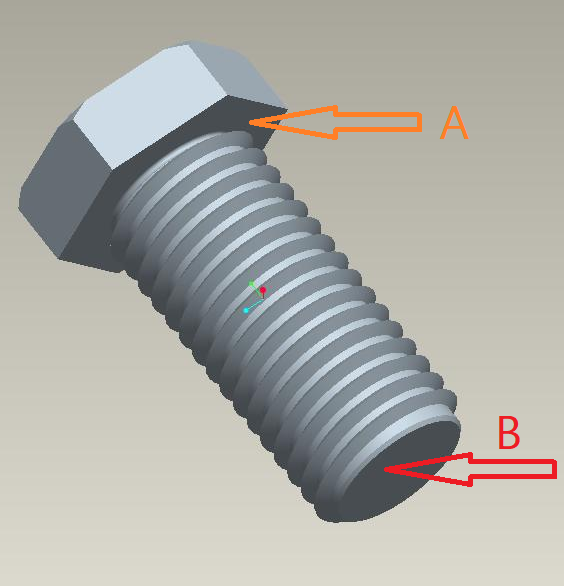
The bearing surface describes the contact area between two objects used as datum. It is often the underside of a screw head (male seat, marked A) or a flat at the end of the screw thread (female seat, marked B).

A bearing surface in mechanical engineering is the area of contact between two objects. It usually is used in reference to bolted joints and bearings, but can be applied to a wide variety of engineering applications. The choice of bearing surface depends on the application, load, speed, and operating conditions, and the design must be able to withstand high loads, resist wear and corrosion, and operate at high speeds.

On a screw, the bearing area loosely refers to the underside of the head. Strictly speaking, the bearing area refers to the area of the screw head that directly bears on the part being fastened.

For a cylindrical bearing, it is the projected area perpendicular to the applied force.

On a spring, the bearing area refers to the amount of area on the top or bottom surface of the spring in contact with the constraining part.

The ways of machine tools, such as dovetail slides, box ways, prismatic ways, and other types of machine slides are also bearing surfaces.

== See also ==
- Babbitt, an alloy that covers a bearing surface
- Bridge bearing
- Pillow block bearing
- Plain bearing
