= White metal =

Type of decorative bright metal alloy

The white metals are a series of often decorative bright metal alloys used as a base for plated silverware, ornaments or novelties, as well as any of several lead-based or tin-based alloys used for things like bearings, jewellery, miniature figures, fusible plugs, some medals and metal type. The term is also used in the antiques trade for an item suspected of being silver, but not hallmarked.

A white metal alloy may include antimony, tin, lead, cadmium, bismuth, and zinc (some of which are quite toxic). Not all of these metals are found in all white metal alloys. Metals are mixed to achieve a desired goal or need. As an example, a base metal for jewellery needs to be castable, polishable, have good flow characteristics, have the ability to cast fine detail without an excessive amount of porosity and cast at between 230 and 300 °C (446 and 572 °F).

== Silver ==
In compliance with British law, the British fine art trade uses the term "white metal" in auction catalogues to describe foreign silver items which do not carry British Assay Office hallmarks, but which are nonetheless understood to be silver and are priced accordingly.

== Tin-lead and tin-copper alloys ==
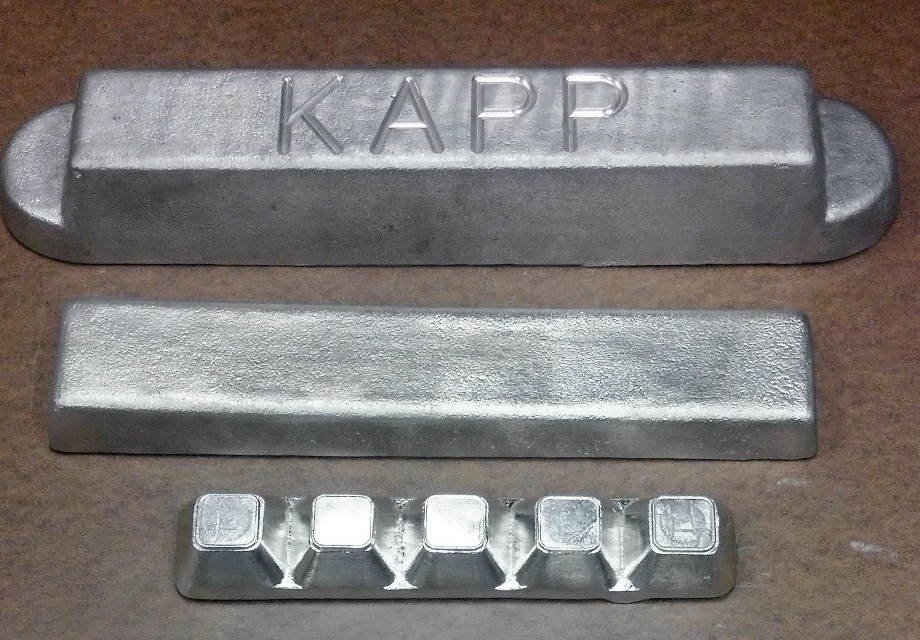
Bars and ingots of Babbitt metal

Tin-lead and tin-copper alloys such as Babbitt metal have a low melting point, which is ideal for use as solder, but these alloys also have ideal characteristics for plain bearings. Most importantly for bearings, the material should be hard and wear-resistant and have a low coefficient of friction. It must also be shock-resistant, tough and sufficiently ductile to allow for slight misalignment prior to running-in.

Pure metals are soft, tough and ductile, with a high coefficient of friction. Intermetallic compounds are hard and wear-resistant but brittle. By themselves, they do not make ideal bearing materials.

Alloys consist of small particles of a hard compound embedded in the tough, ductile background of a solid solution. In service, the latter can wear away slightly, leaving the hard compound to carry the load. That wear also provides channels to allow in lubricant (oils). All bearing metals contain antimony (Sb), which forms hard cubic crystals.

% Sn	% Sb	% Cu	% Pb	Applications
93	3.5	3.5	–	Light and medium internal combustion engine big-end bearings
86	10.5	3.5	–	Light and medium internal combustion engine main bearings
80	11	3.0	6.0	General-purpose heavy bearings (lead increases plasticity)
60	10	28.5	1.5	Heavy-duty marine engine bearings, electrical machines
40	10	1.5	48.5	Low-cost, general-purpose, medium-duty bearings

== Applications ==
White metals are commonly used in bearings and bushings because of their high load-bearing capacity and self-lubricating properties, which reduce friction and extend the lifespan of these components. In the automotive industry, they are found in engine components like crankshaft and connecting rod bearings. Additionally, white metal is popular in jewellery and decorative items due to its cost-effectiveness and ability to mimic more expensive metals like silver. In the printing industry, white metal alloys were historically used to cast typefaces.

== See also ==
- Britannia metal
- Nickel silver
- Pewter
- Pot metal
- Punchcutting
- Spelter
- Wood's metal
- Zamak
