= Hardened steel =

Carbon steel quenched and tempered after a heat treatment

The term hardened steel is often used for a medium or high carbon steel that has been given heat treatment and then quenching followed by tempering. The quenching results in the formation of metastable martensite, the fraction of which is reduced to the desired amount during tempering. This is the most common state for finished articles such as tools and machine parts. In contrast, the same steel composition in annealed state is softer, as required for forming and machining.

Depending on the temperature and composition of the steel, it can be hardened or softened. To make steel harder, it must be heated to very high temperatures. The final result of exactly how hard the steel becomes depends on the amount of carbon present in the metal. Only steel that is high in carbon can be hardened and tempered. If a metal does not contain the necessary quantity of carbon, then its crystalline structure cannot be broken, and therefore the physical makeup of the steel cannot be altered.

Frequently, the term "hardening" is associated with tempered steel. Both processes are used hand in hand when hardening steel. The two-part process begins with hardening the steel so that it becomes hard and does not wear over time. However, very often, this process leaves the steel very brittle and susceptible to breaking during use. Tempering reduces the hardness of the forged steel very slightly but improves the overall product as it results in steel that is much less brittle.

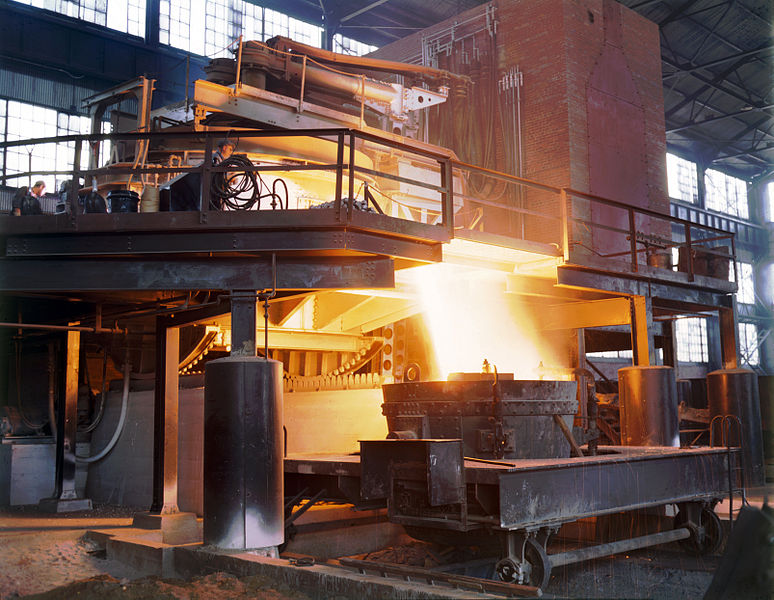
An electric arc furnace being tapped.

== Hardening and tempering ==
The two major processes of hardening and tempering can be broken down into four major steps. First, a piece of carbon steel is heated gradually until it reaches a temperature above the alloy's critical temperature. The steel is then quenched, usually in water or oil (though other quenches, such as brine or sodium hydroxide solutions, are sometimes used to achieve a particular result). The steel is now at that given alloy's maximum hardness, but as stated above, also brittle. At this point, tempering is usually performed to achieve a more useful balance of hardness and toughness. The steel is gradually heated until the desired temper colours are drawn, generally at a temperature significantly lower than the alloy's critical temperature. Different colours in the temper spectrum reflect different balances of hardness to toughness, so different temper levels are appropriate for different applications. The steel is then re-quenched to 'fix' the temper at the desired level. A talented smith or metalworker can fine-tune the performance of a steel tool or item to precisely what is required based solely on careful observation of temper colours.

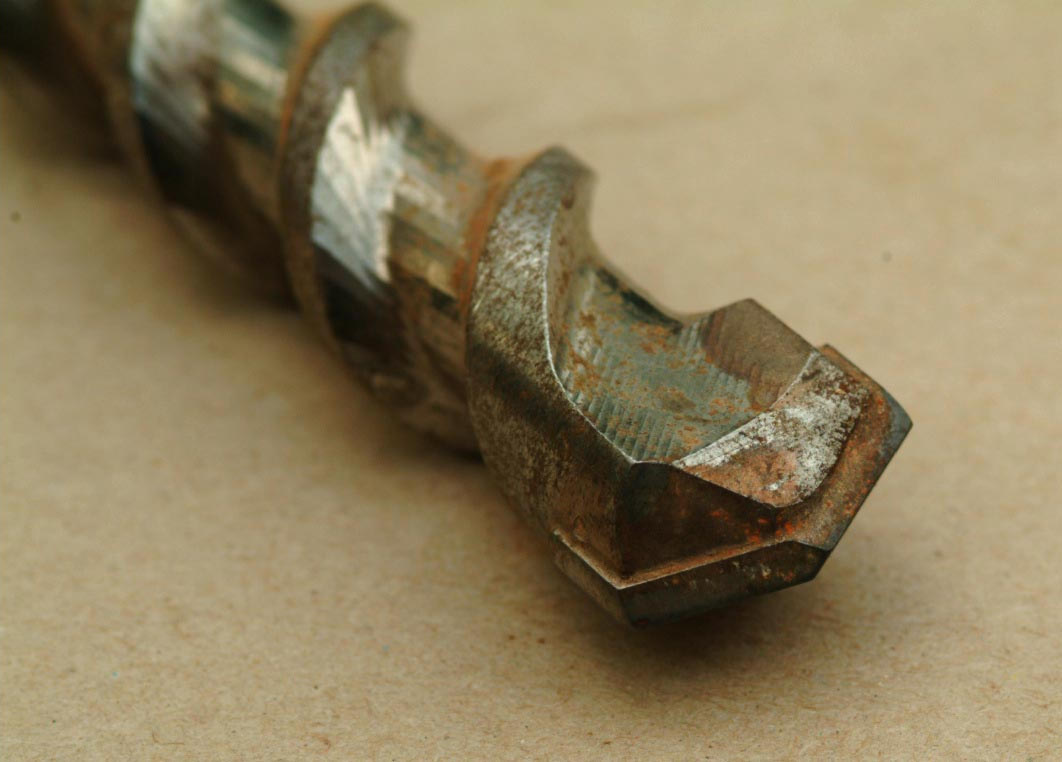
A masonry drill bit made of hardened steel.

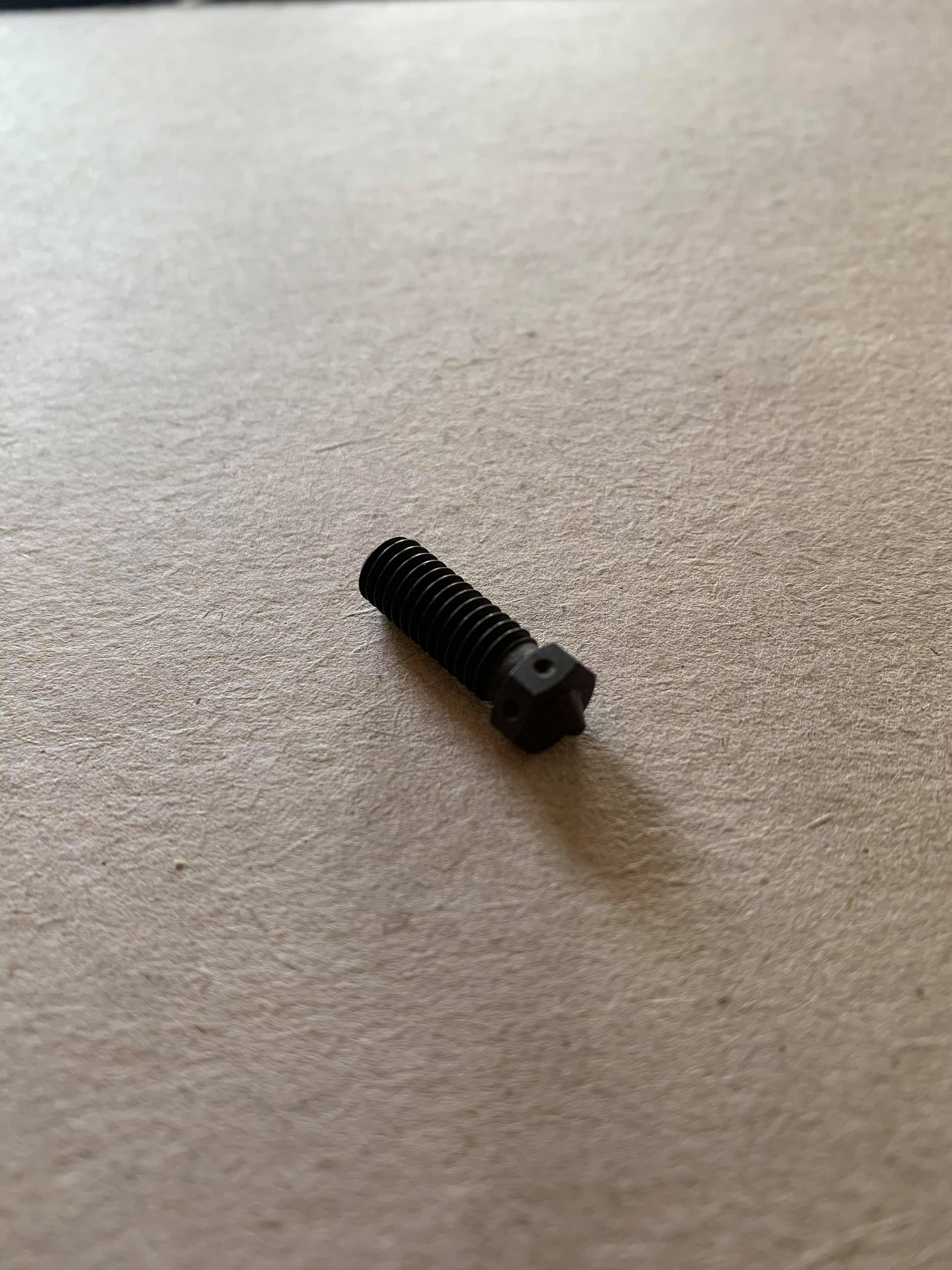
Hardened steel 3D printing nozzle

== Testing for hardened steel ==
It is not easy to determine if steel has undergone the hardening and tempering process by simply looking at it, but there is a reliable and simple test. To examine a piece of steel, obtain a hand file and file an edge of the selected metal. If the piece of steel has not undergone the hardening process, the metal file should easily 'bite' into the sample. If the metal has been hardened, the file fails to cut into the sample and glances off with little visible effect.

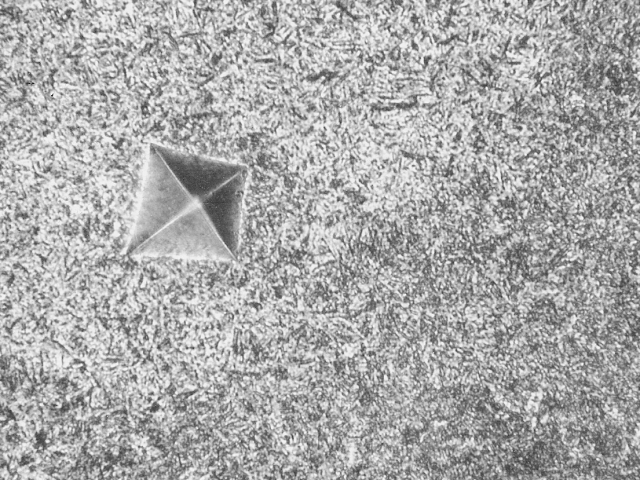
Case hardened steel-Vickers hardness test

Case hardened articles starting as low carbon steel (0.5% to 1.5% carbon content) can also be labeled hardened steel.
