= Rulon (plastic) =

Trade name for a family of PTFE plastics

Rulon is the trade name for a family of PTFE plastics produced by Saint-Gobain Performance Plastics. Rulon plastics are known for their low coefficient of friction, excellent abrasion resistance, wide range of operating temperatures, and chemical inertness. Common applications for Rulon include seals, piston rings, bearings, and electrical insulation.

== History ==
Rulon, not to be confused with Mulon, was produced by Dixon Industries Corporation in 1952 and named after its then President, Robert Rulon-Miller. This first type of Rulon was dubbed "Rulon A" (which was later replaced with type AR). Dixon was then bought by the Furon company. Furon was purchased by Saint-Gobain Performance Plastics.

== Properties and types ==
There are many different types of Rulon produced for specific applications. These include:

- Rulon A, obsolete
- Rulon AR, maroon, used for seals & stronger than Rulon LR
- Rulon LR, maroon, has low deformation characteristics
- Rulon J, gold, polymer filled for more abrasion resistance and softer mating surface
- Rulon 641, white, U.S. Food and Drug Administration compliant
- Rulon W2, used in fresh water applications
- Rulon 123, FDA compliant with low and consistent friction characteristics
- Rulon 488, inorganic filler used for compatibility with most surfaces
- Rulon 957, green speckled, bearing grade with noise dampening characteristics
- Rulon XL, tan, low friction; suitable for aluminium; excellent outgassing characteristics for use in vacuums
- Rulon F, green, polymer filled with excellent anti-abrasion characteristics
- Rulon 142, aqua, low deformation material for used in linear bearings and slides
- Rulon 945, black, very low deformation characteristics for use in high heat and impact applications
- Rulon 1045, gold, highly elastic and moderately deformable for use as bearings, rings and seals
- Rulon 1337, tan, FDA compliant with low coefficient of friction and excellent chemical resistance
- Rulon 1410, gold, highly elastic
- Rulon 1439, white, FDA compliant for use in submerged applications with low wear characteristics

Rulon A has a 1000 fold increase in wear resistance as compared to PTFE. However, it machines much like PTFE. It can also be moulded, extruded, skived, stamped, and hot and cold formed. Below is a table of properties pertaining to Rulon AR, but note that the other types of Rulon have similar properties.

Properties of Rulon AR
Properties	Test procedure used	Value
Specific gravity	ASTM D792	2.22
Hardness	ASTM D2240	60 - 75 Shore D
Water absorption	ASTM D570	0
Tensile strength	ASTM D4894	2,000 psi (14 MPa)
Elongation	ASTM D4894	175%
Deformation under load 1500 psi, 24 hr, RT	ASTM D621	5.0%
Izod impact strength	n/a	6.0 ft-lb/in (320 J/m)
Thermal conductivity	ASTM D2214	2.3 BTU·in/(hr·ft^{2}·°F) (0.33 W/m·K)
Operating temperature range	n/a	−400 to 550 °F (−240 to 290 °C)
Flammability	ASTM D635	non-flammable
Maximum pressure (P)	n/a	1,000 psi (6.9 MPa)
Maximum velocity with no pressure (V)	n/a	400 ft/min (2.0 m/s)
Maximum PV	n/a	10,000 psi·ft/min (0.35 MPa·m/s)
Minimum mating surface hardness	n/a	35 RC
