= Surface feet per minute =

Unit of velocity combining surface speed and feet per minute

Surface feet per minute (SFPM or SFM) is the combination of a physical quantity (surface speed) and an imperial and American customary unit (feet per minute or FPM). It is defined as the number of linear feet that a location on a rotating component travels in one minute. Its most common use is in the measurement of cutting speed (surface speed) in machining. It is a unit of velocity that describes how fast the cutting edge of the cutting tool travels. It correlates directly to the machinability of the workpiece material and the hardness of the cutting tool material. It relates to spindle speed via variables such as cutter diameter (for rotating cutters) or workpiece diameter (for lathe work).

SFM is a combination of diameter and the velocity (RPM) of the material measured in feet-per-minute as the spindle of a milling machine or lathe. 1 SFM equals 0.00508 surface meter per second (meter per second, or m/s, is the SI unit of speed). The faster the spindle turns, and/or the larger the diameter, the higher the SFM. However some materials will run better at specific SFMs. When the SFM is known for a specific material (ex 303 annealed stainless steel = 120 SFM for high speed steel tooling), a formula can be used to determine spindle speed for live tools or spindle speeds for turning materials.

In a milling machine, the tool diameter is used instead of the stock diameter in the following formulas when the tool is revolving and the stock is stationary.

Spindle speed can be calculated using the following equation:

$\text{Spindle speed (RPM)} = \frac{SFM}{\pi \times \frac{1}{12} \times \text{stock diameter (in)}} \approx \frac{SFM}{0.2618 \times \text{stock diameter (in)}}$

SFM can be calculated using the following equation:

$SFM = \text{stock diameter (in)} \times \pi \times \frac{1 (\text{ft})}{12 (\text{in})} \times \text{RPM} \approx \text{stock diameter (in)} \times 0.2618 \operatorname{RPM}$

== See also ==
- Speeds and feeds
