= Fiori (surname) =

Fiori is an Italian surname. Notable people with the surname include:

- Adriano Fiori (1865–1950), Italian botanist
- Al Fiori (born 1929), American former Los Angeles radio personality and pioneer rock and roll DJ
- Attilio Fiori (1883–1958), Italian entomologist
- Carlos Eduardo de Fiori Mendes (born 1986), better known as Cadù, Brazilian footballer
- Diego Fulvio Fiori (born 1975), Italian artist, director and film producer
- Ed Fiori (1953–2025), American golfer
- Ezio Fiori (born 1949), Italian bobsleigher
- Fabrizio Della Fiori (born 1951), Italian basketball player
- Federico Fiori (1535–1612), Italian Renaissance painter and printmaker
- Henri Fiori (1881–1963), French politician
- Jennifer Fiori (1986–2021), Italian cyclist
- Juliano Fiori (born 1985), Brazilian rugby sevens player
- Mario P. Fiori (born 1941), United States Assistant Secretary of the Army
- Patrick Fiori (born 1969), French singer
- Publio Fiori (1938–2024), Italian politician
- Serge Fiori (1952–2025), Canadian singer-songwriter and musician
- Valerio Fiori (born 1969), Italian footballer
