= Bar stock =

Bar of raw metal to be processed and manufactured

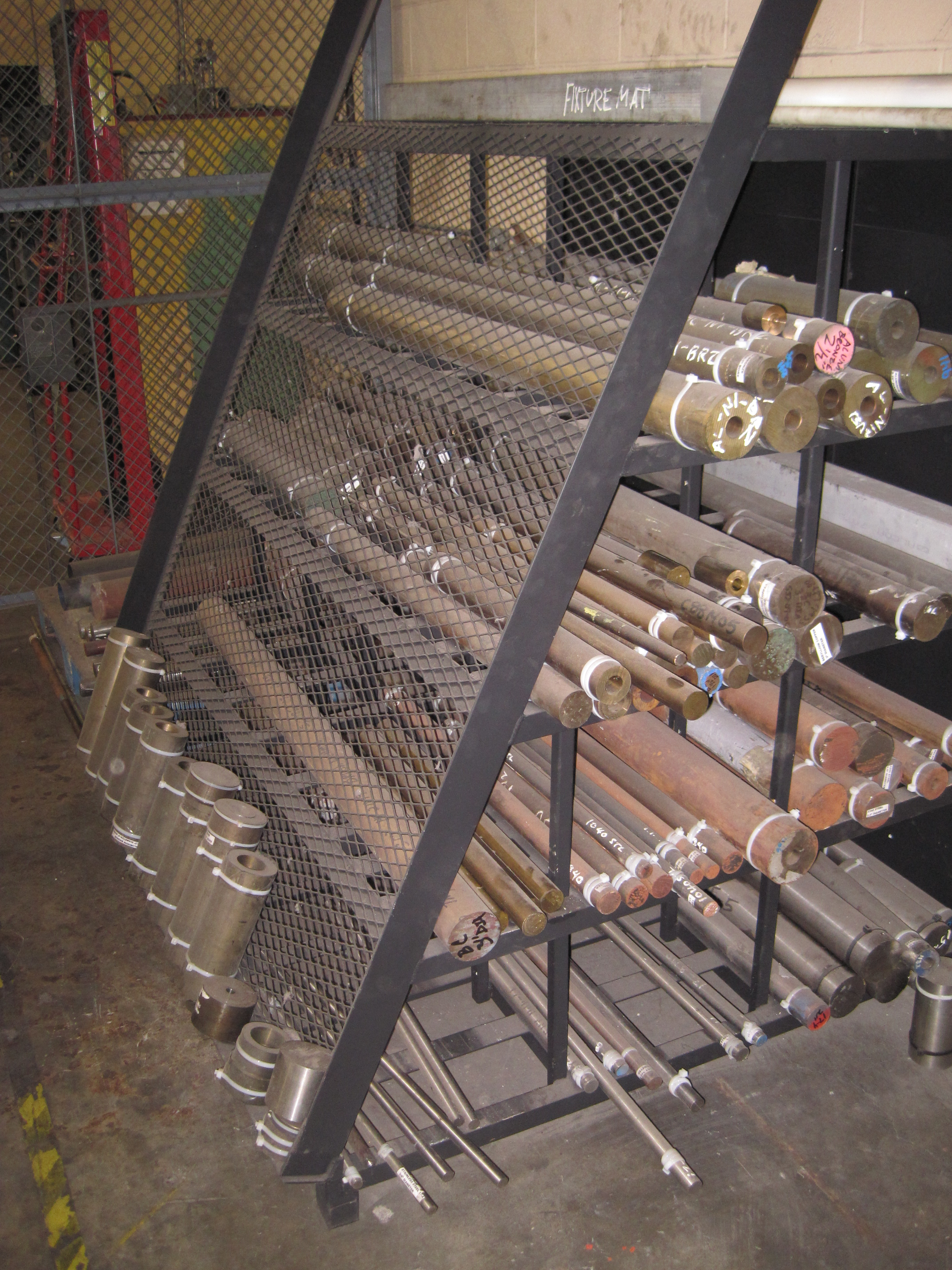
Storage area containing assorted bar stock.

Bar stock, also (colloquially) known as blank, slug or billet, is a common form of raw purified metal, used by industry to manufacture metal parts and products. Bar stock is available in a variety of extrusion shapes and lengths. The most common shapes are round (circular cross-section), rectangular, square and hexagonal. A bar is characterised by an "enclosed invariant convex cross-section", meaning that pipes, angle stock and objects with varying diameter are not considered bar stock.

Bar stock is commonly processed by a sequence of sawing, turning, milling, drilling and grinding to produce a final product, often vastly different from the original stock. In some cases, the process is partially automated by specialized equipment which feeds the stock into the appropriate processing machine.

== Process and types ==
Most metal produced by a steel mill or aluminium plant is formed (via rolling or extrusion) into long continuous strips of various size and shape. These strips are cut at regular intervals and allowed to cool, each segment becoming a piece of bar stock. A good analogy is pasta-making, in which lumps of dough are extruded into various cross-sectional shapes; cut into lengths; and then dried in that form. The cross-sectional shapes of pasta vary from simple bar or tube shapes (such as linguine or penne) to more elaborate extrusions (such as rotelle, fiori, or rotini). The same is true of metal bar stock. The most common shapes are round bar (also called rod), rectangular bar (including square bar, the special case of equal sides), and hexagonal bar (usually called hex bar for short). Tube and pipe are similar, but have hollow centers and are traditionally not called "bar" in industrial usage. (However, a product called hollow bar, essentially tube but with custom-orderable OD and ID and thus custom wall thickness, is marketed for lathe bar work which can benefit from obviation of drilling and rough boring.) Also similar in concept, but not called "bar", are the common structural shapes such as angle stock and channel stock. These are commonly available in steel and aluminum; the names "angle iron" and "channel iron" are still commonly used (informally) even though their literal namesake, wrought iron, has been replaced by steel and aluminum for most uses.

In a machine shop, bar stock and plate are often called billet, although in a rolling mill, that word refers to a piece of metal that has not yet been rolled into bar.

A machine shop typically has a storage area containing a large variety of bar stock. To create a metal component, a bar of sufficient volume is selected from storage and brought to the machining area. This piece may then be sawed, milled, drilled, turned, or ground to remove material and create the final shape. In turning, for large-diameter work (typically more than 100 millimetres (3.9 in), although there is no universal threshold), a piece of the bar is cut off using a horizontal bandsaw to create a blank for each part. The blanks are then fed into a chucking lathe (chucker) which chucks each one in turn. For smaller-diameter work, the entire length of bar stock is more often fed through the spindle of the lathe. The entire bar rotates with the spindle during the part-machining cycle. When the cycle ends and one part is done, the chuck opens, the bar is pulled or pushed forward ("fed") by any of various automatic means, the chuck closes, and the next cycle begins. The last step of the cycle is to cut off the machined part from the bar, which is called "parting it off" and is achieved with a "cutoff" or "part-off" tool, a tool bit that grooves the bar all the way down to the centreline, causing the part to fall off. Then the cycle repeats.

The not-yet-cut bar protruding from the back of the spindle, rotating quickly, can present a safety hazard if it is sticking out too far and unconstrained from bending. Thus sometimes long bars must be sawn into shorter bars before being fed as "bar work" (which is the term for such work).

CNC lathes and screw machines have accessories called "bar feeders", which hold, guide, and feed the bar as commanded by the CNC control. More advanced machines may have a "bar loader" which holds multiple bars and feeds them one at a time into the bar feeder. Bar loaders are like magazines for part blanks (or pallets for milling work) in that they allow lights-out machining. The bar loader is filled with bars (or the magazine or pallet with part blanks) during working hours, and then it runs during the night unattended. Given that there is no human around to detect if something went wrong and the machine should stop, there are various kinds of sensors that are used to detect this, such as load meters, infrared beams, and, in recent years, webcams, which are placed inside the machine tool's enclosure and allow remote viewing of the cutting action.

== Uses of bar stock ==
Bar stock is widely used in many industries and can be seen in many different industrial processes. These processes include forging, extrusion, machining, and many more. In forging, billets are heated to high temperatures before a press pushes the workpiece into the shape on the die. These presses operate at very high forces to make the desired changes to the product. Extrusion uses rollers that push the heated bar stock through a set of dies which will determine the shape of the workpiece. Machining is a subtractive process that utilizes bar stock and various cutters and tools to make intricate details that are not possible through other processes.

== Standard sizes throughout a supply chain ==
To stock every possible size of bar stock (every possible fraction of a millimeter or inch in diameter or thickness) is impossible. Thus, bar stock is stocked by metals supply houses in various standard sizes, arrayed in discrete steps. For example, round bar with diameters of even millimeters (or in the US, on the eighths of an inch) can usually be ordered from standing stock. Bar diameters of nonstandard sizes can also be obtained, but only as a separate mill run from the rolling mill. Thus they are much more expensive than the standard sizes, can take much longer delivery time, and are not desirable as inventory for the supply house or the machine shop (because the chance of selling or using any particular custom size is slim).

Sometimes it is necessary that the bar not be very much larger than the intended part, because the metallurgical properties of some metal alloys in some finishing processes may vary by how far inside the bar the metal lies. Thus an engineering drawing will specify a certain size (or a maximum size) that the bar may start out as. These specs face the aforementioned limitation of stocking sizes versus custom mill runs; standard sizes are used wherever possible to avoid wasted expense and needless delays.

== Drill rod ==
A drill rod is tool steel round stock ground to a tight tolerance diameter; it is usually ± 0.0005 in (0.0127 mm). In the UK the name "silver steel" is often synonymous and sometimes hyponymous. Its origin was in reference to the shiny ground appearance (not to any silver alloying content). Drill rod diameters range from 0.0135 to 1.5 in (0.34 to 38.10 mm); in the United States diameters smaller than 27/64th of an inch (11 mm) are made in letter drill sizes and number drill sizes, in addition to fractional sizes. Lengths are usually one or three feet (0.3048 or 0.9144 m). It is commonly used to make drill bits, taps, reamers, punches, dowel pins, and shafts. Note that the numbered sizes are different from the drill numbered sizes starting at 52. These sizes are:

gauge	in	mm
52	0.0630	1.6002
51	0.0660	1.6764
50	0.0690	1.7526
49	0.0720	1.8288
48	0.0750	1.9050
47	0.0770	1.9558
46	0.0790	2.0066
45	0.0810	2.0574
44	0.0850	2.1590
43	0.0880	2.2352
42	0.0920	2.3368
41	0.0950	2.4130
40	0.0970	2.4638

gauge	in	mm
39	0.0990	2.5146
38	0.1010	2.5654
37	0.1030	2.6162
36	0.1060	2.6924
35	0.1080	2.7432
34	0.1100	2.7940
33	0.1120	2.8448
32	0.1150	2.9210
31	0.1200	3.0480
30	0.1270	3.2258
29	0.1340	3.4036
28	0.1390	3.5306
27	0.1430	3.6322

gauge	in	mm
26	0.1460	3.7084
25	0.1480	3.7592
24	0.1510	3.8354
23	0.1530	3.8862
22	0.1550	3.9370
21	0.1570	3.9878
20	0.1610	4.0894
19	0.1640	4.1656
18	0.1680	4.2672
17	0.1720	4.3688
16	0.1750	4.4450
15	0.1780	4.5212
14	0.1800	4.5720

gauge	in	mm
13	0.1820	4.6228
12	0.1850	4.6990
11	0.1880	4.7752
10	0.1910	4.8514
9	0.1940	4.9276
8	0.1970	5.0038
7	0.1990	5.0546
6	0.2010	5.1054
5	0.2040	5.1816
4	0.2070	5.2578
3	0.2120	5.3848
2	0.2190	5.5626
1	0.2270	5.7658

Drill blanks have an undersize tolerance of +0/−0.0002 in (0.00508 mm), while reamer blanks have an oversize tolerance of −0/+00.0002 in (0.00508 mm).

Some mills also sell square stock that is held to the same tolerances under the name "drill rod".

Commonly available material grades in the U.S. are A2, D2, M2, M42, O1, S7, W1, and high speed steel (including M2/M7).

== Ground flat stock ==
Ground flat stock is annealed steel that has been ground to close tolerances (compare to drill rod). There are four types of materials available: O-1 tool steel, A-2 tool steel, A-6 tool steel, and 1018 steel (low-carbon or low-carb steel). Lengths are either 18 or 36 in (457 or 914 mm) long, various widths up to 16 in (406 mm) are available, and thicknesses range from 1/64 to 2.875 in (0.40 to 73.03 mm).

Some geometrical sizes are known as gauge plate.

== See also ==
- Bar puller
- Dowel
