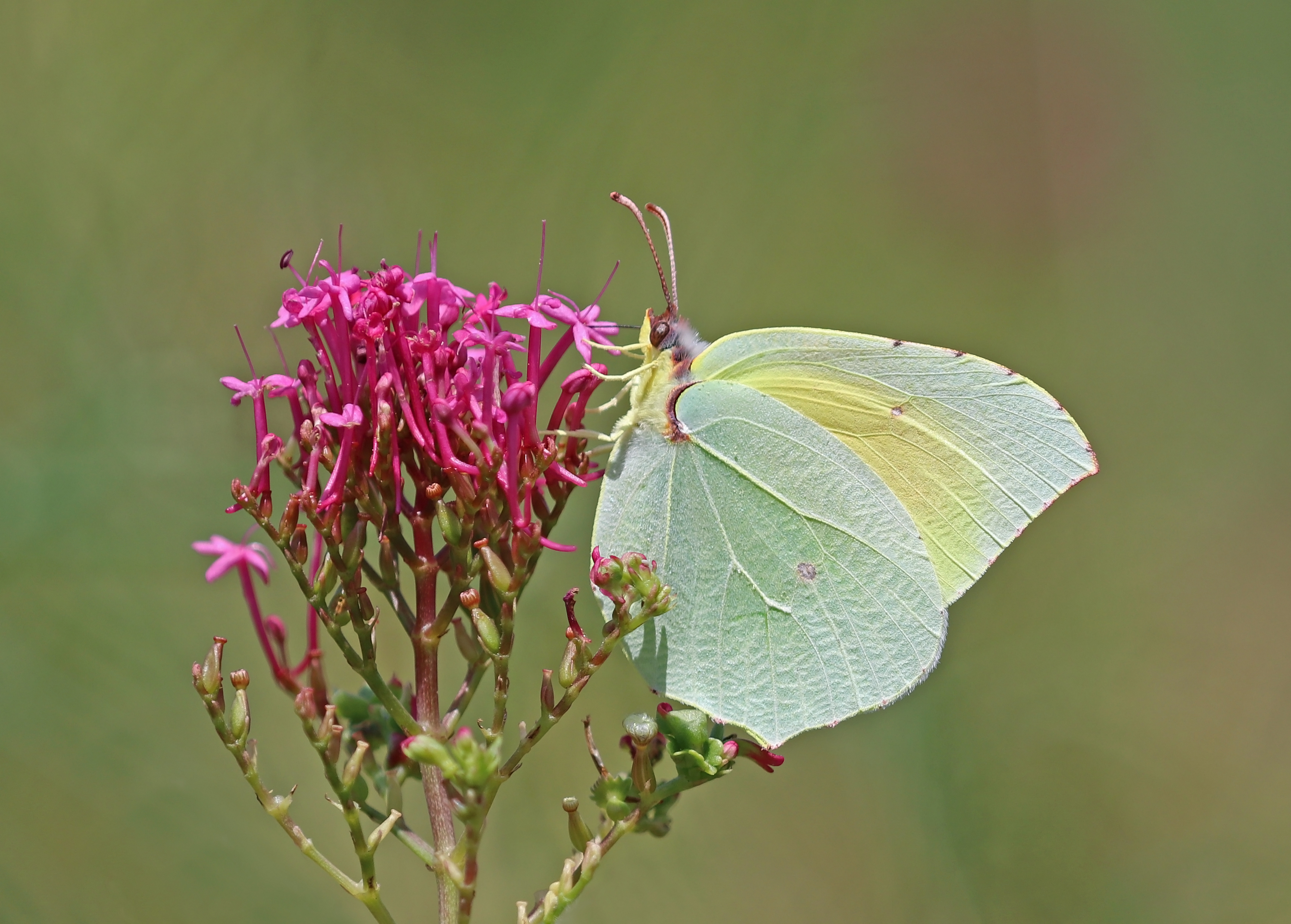
- Male, Italy

Conservation status
- Least Concern (IUCN 3.1)

Scientific classification
- Kingdom: Animalia
- Phylum: Arthropoda
- Clade: Pancrustacea
- Class: Insecta
- Order: Lepidoptera
- Family: Pieridae
- Genus: Gonepteryx
- Species: G. cleopatra

Binomial name
- Gonepteryx cleopatra (Linnaeus, 1767)

= Gonepteryx cleopatra =

Cleopatra

Species of butterfly

Gonepteryx cleopatra, the Cleopatra or Cleopatra butterfly, is a medium-sized butterfly of the family Pieridae.

== Subspecies ==
The species Gonepteryx cleopatra is divided into the following ten subspecies:

- G. c. cleopatra (Linnaeus, 1767) – North Africa, Portugal, Spain, Sicily
- G. c. balearica Bubacek, 1920 – Balearic Islands
- G. c. petronella De Freina, 1977 – Ibiza
- G. c. italica (Gerhardt, 1882) – Italy, France, Corsica, Sardinia
- G. c. dalmatica Verity, 1908 – Dalmatian coast, western Balkans
- G. c. citrina Sheljuzhko, 1925 – southern Greece, Corfu
- G. c. insularis Verity, 1909 – Crete
- G. c. fiorii Turati & Fiori, 1930 – Rhodes
- G. c. taurica (Staudinger, 1881) – Anatolia, Syria, Jordan, Israel, Cyprus
- G. c. palmata Turati, 1921 – Cyrenaica, Libya

== Appearance ==
Gonepteryx cleopatra is a medium-sized butterfly with a wingspan of about 50–70 mm (2.0–2.8 in). It is a sexually dimorphic species; the female has pale yellow or greenish wings, whereas the male is darker yellow with an orange patch on the forewing. Both sexes have a forewing apical hook and brown dots in the center of each wing, and the underside of wings is light greenish yellow. The greenish color, the shape and the pronounced venation on the hindwings give to these butterflies a good camouflage, making them resemble just leaves.

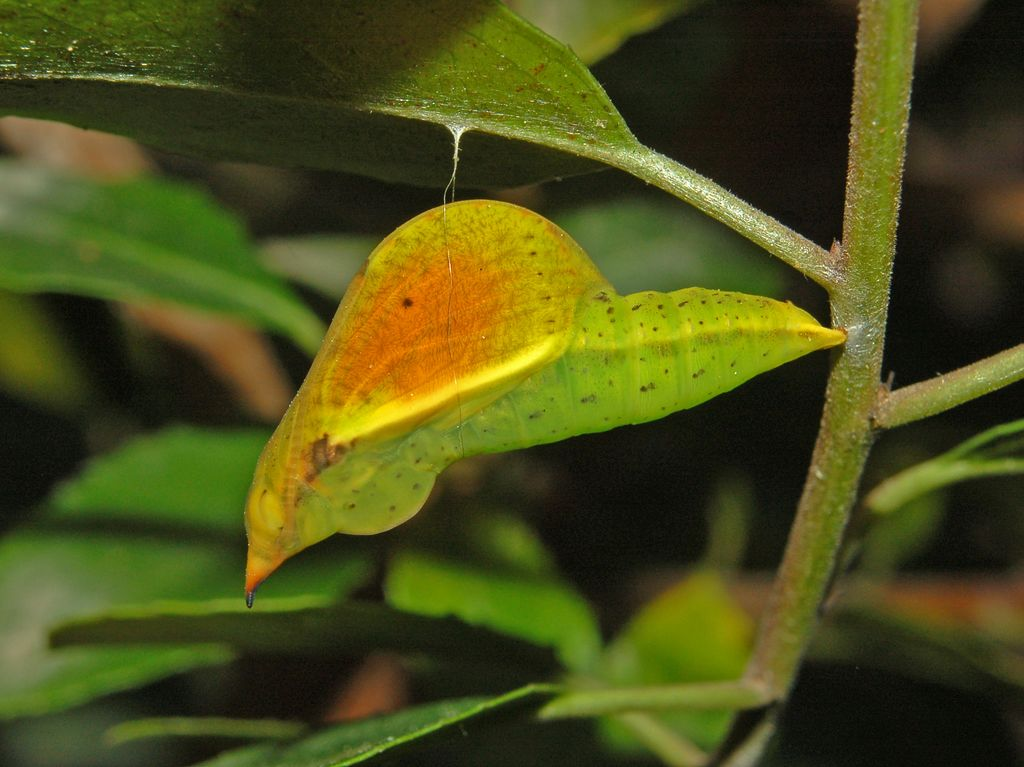
Chrysalis of a male

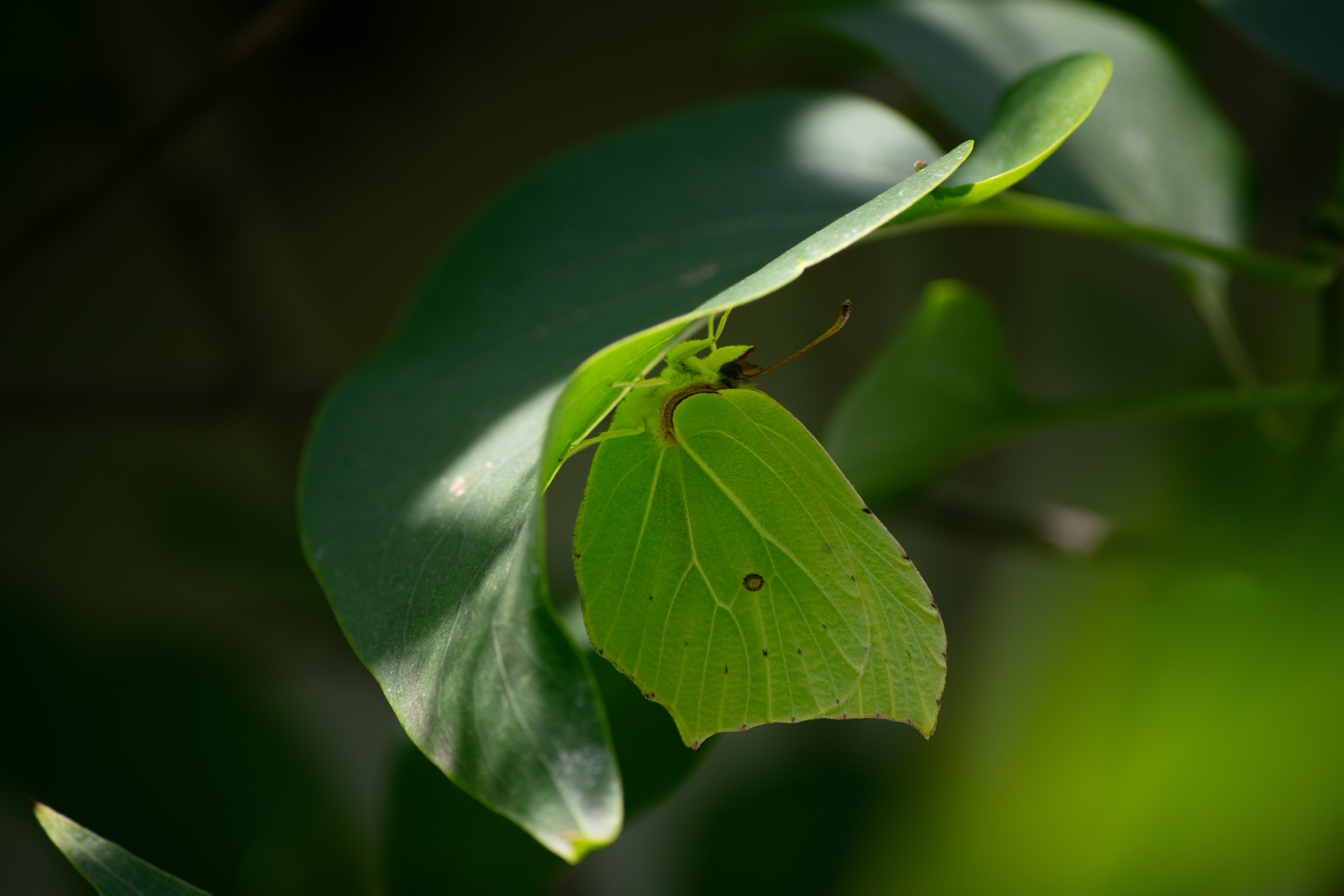
The wings of Gonepteryx cleopatra acting as camouflage

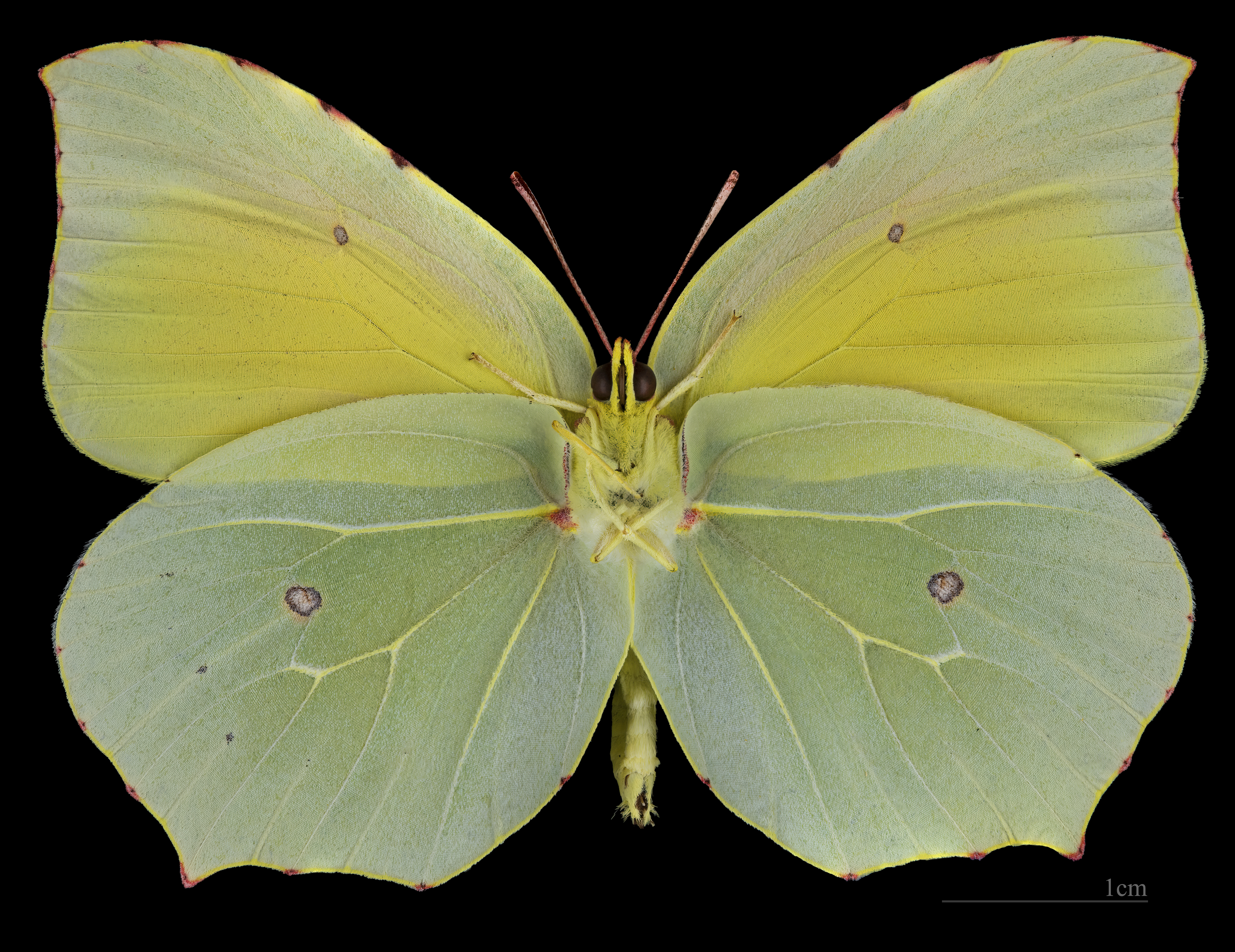
Gonepteryx cleopatra ♂

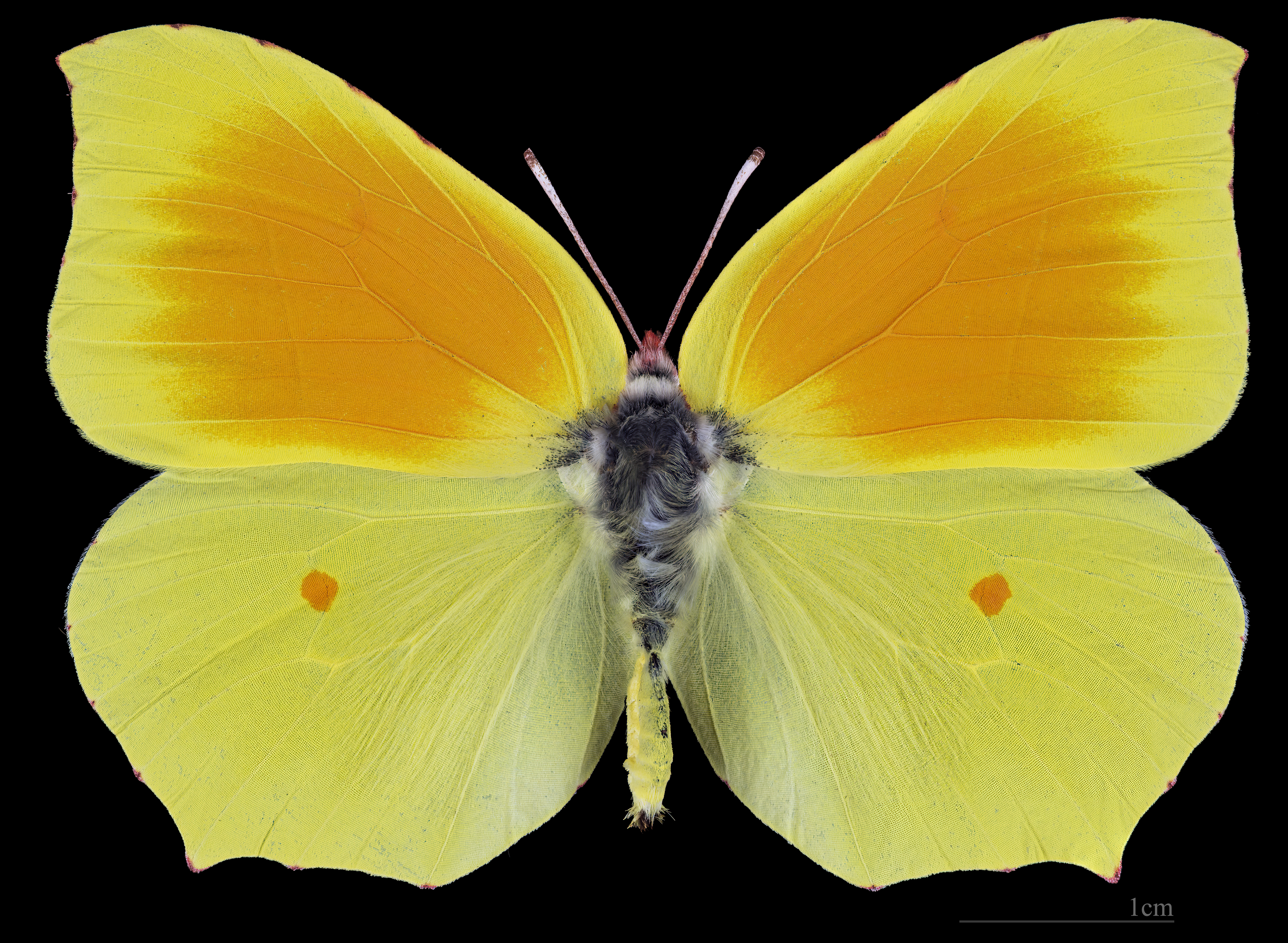
Gonepteryx cleopatra ♂ △

== Ecology ==
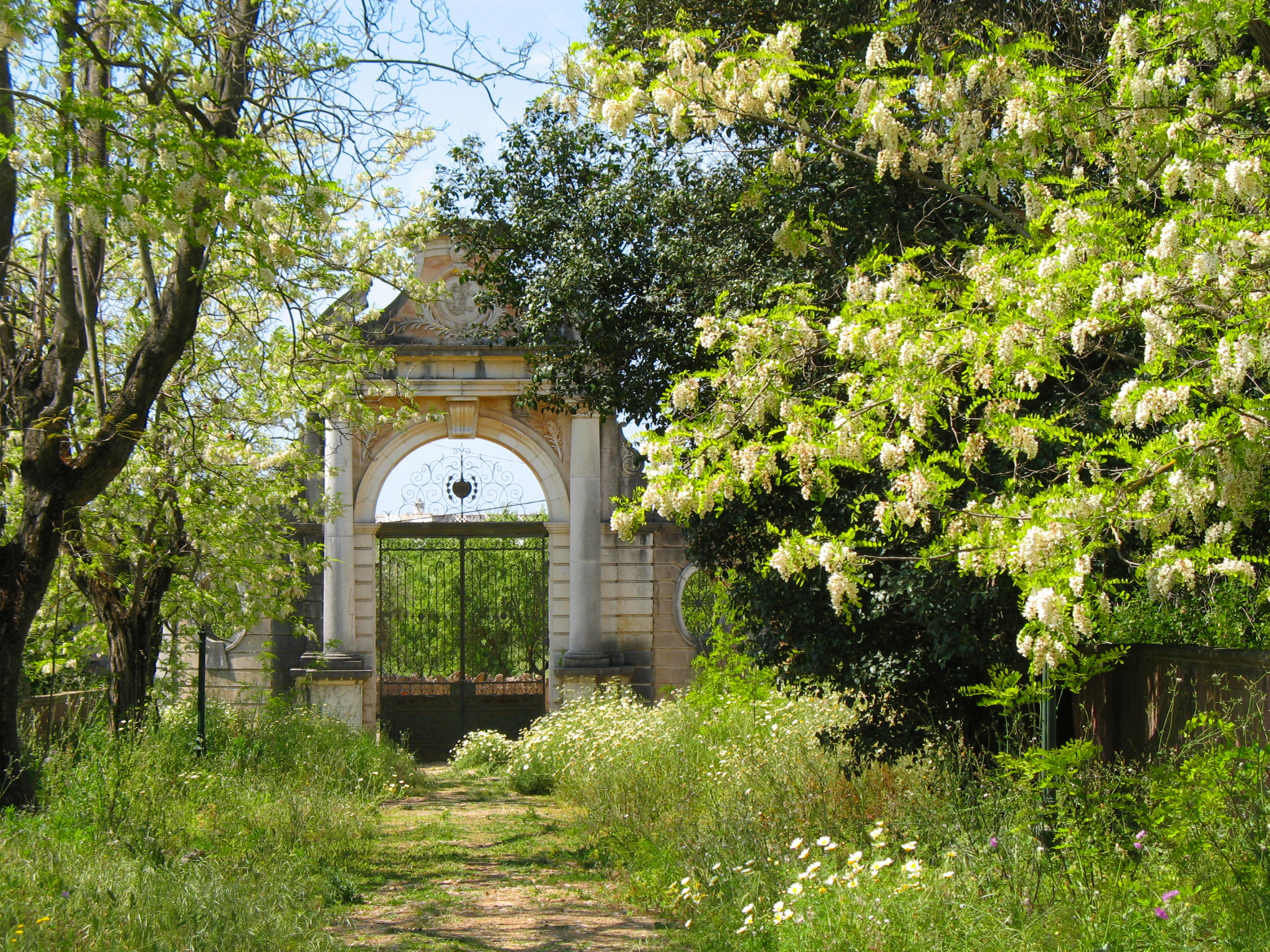
Garden habitat in Portugal

The Cleopatra butterfly inhabits open woodland and scrub. The flight period is from May to August in most parts of its range, except Spain, where it is double brooded and may fly almost all year. The adult hibernates in evergreen trees and shrubs. The caterpillars feed on the buckthorns Rhamnus alaternus. When the green caterpillars are prepared to pass to the pupal stage, they tie themselves through a silk belt to the host plant, on the underside of a leaf. The green chrysalis became gradually yellow and red, revealing the colors on the wings of the adult close to flutter. In dry regions, the Cleopatra practices a vertical migration between the maquis and the mountain fir forests. It emerges in spring at low altitudes, then migrates to higher altitudes in the mountains and stays there in the summer months to descend in autumn at low altitudes.

== Distribution ==
This species is native to the Mediterranean region (Southern Europe, North Africa and West Asia).
