= Fiori =

Fiori may refer to:

- Fiori (pasta), a decorative shape of extruded pasta
- Fiori (surname), various people with the surname
- Fiori musicali, a collection of liturgical organ music by Girolamo Frescobaldi, first published in 1635
- Campo de' Fiori, a rectangular square south of Piazza Navona in Rome, Italy
- Fiori Group, an Italian company
- S.P. Tre Fiori (Società Polisportiva Tre Fiori), a Sanmarinese football club

== See also ==
- Fiore (disambiguation)
