= Coleophora aeneostrigella =

Scientific classification
- Kingdom: Animalia
- Phylum: Arthropoda
- Class: Insecta
- Order: Lepidoptera
- Family: Coleophoridae
- Genus: Coleophora
- Species: C. aeneostrigella

Binomial name
- Coleophora aeneostrigella Turati, 1930

Species of moth

Coleophora aeneostrigella is a moth of the family Coleophoridae that is endemic to Libya.
