= Fiorucci (surname) =

Fiorucci is a surname of Italian origin. Notable people with the surname include:

- Elio Fiorucci (1935–2015), Italian fashion designer and entrepreneur
- Nick Fiorucci, Canadian electronic and dance music DJ, songwriter, and founder of record label Hi-Bias Records
- Vittorio Fiorucci (1932–2008), Italian Canadian poster artist

== See also ==
- Fiori (disambiguation)
