= Coleophora straminella =

Scientific classification
- Kingdom: Animalia
- Phylum: Arthropoda
- Class: Insecta
- Order: Lepidoptera
- Family: Coleophoridae
- Genus: Coleophora
- Species: C. straminella

Binomial name
- Coleophora straminella Turati, 1934

Species of insect

Coleophora straminella is a moth of the family Coleophoridae that is endemic to Libya.
