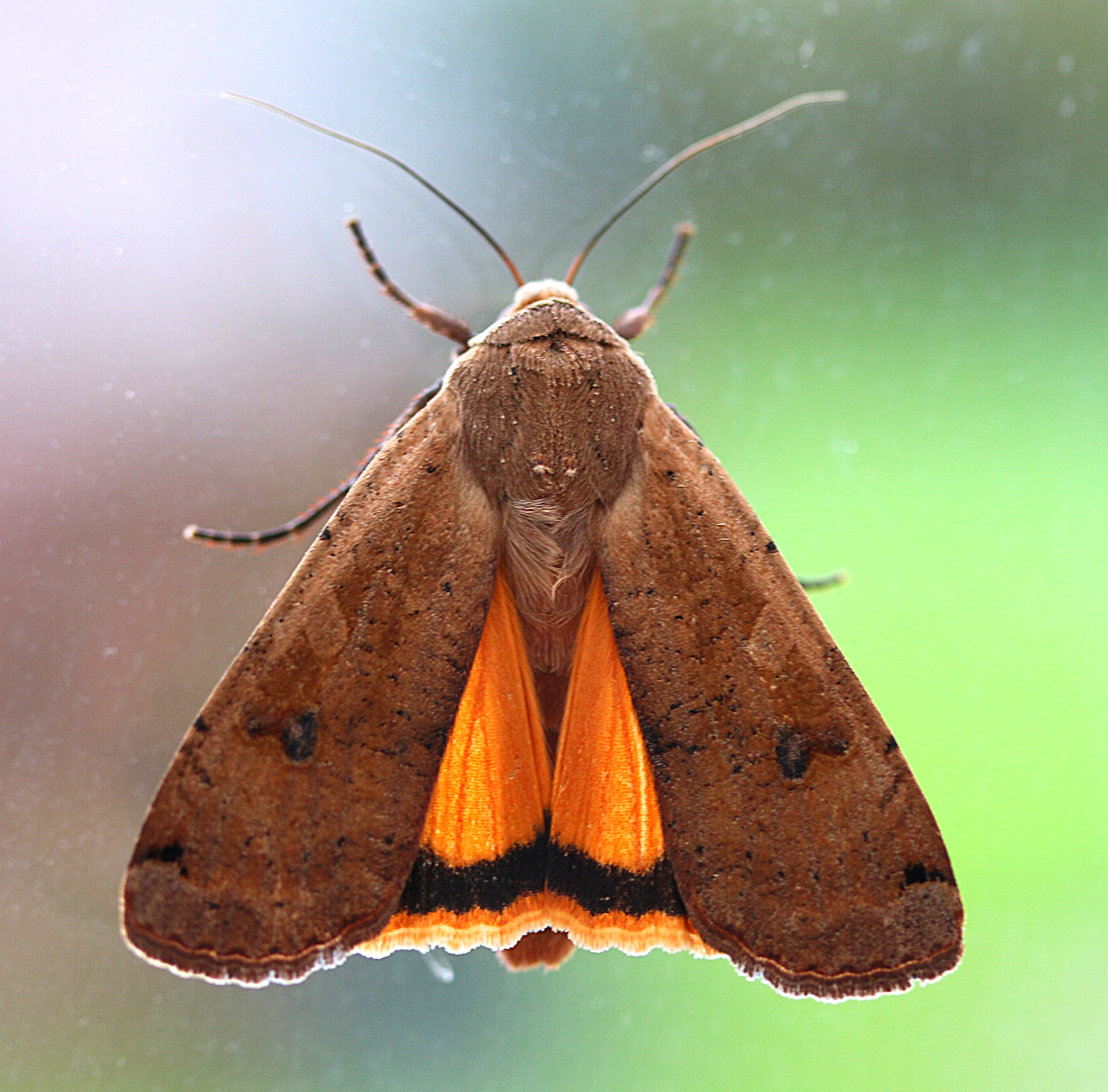

Scientific classification
- Kingdom: Animalia
- Phylum: Arthropoda
- Clade: Pancrustacea
- Class: Insecta
- Order: Lepidoptera
- Superfamily: Noctuoidea
- Family: Noctuidae
- Genus: Noctua
- Species: N. pronuba

Binomial name
- Noctua pronuba (Linnaeus, 1758)

Synonyms
- Phalaena (Noctua) pronuba Linnaeus, 1758; Noctua connuba Hübner, [1822]; Triphaena innuba Treitschke, 1825; Triphaena pronuba var. hoegei Herrich-Schäffer, 1861; Agrotis pronuba var. nigra Krausse, 1912; Rhyacia pronuba f. decolorata Turati, 1923

= Large yellow underwing =

Species of Eurasian moth

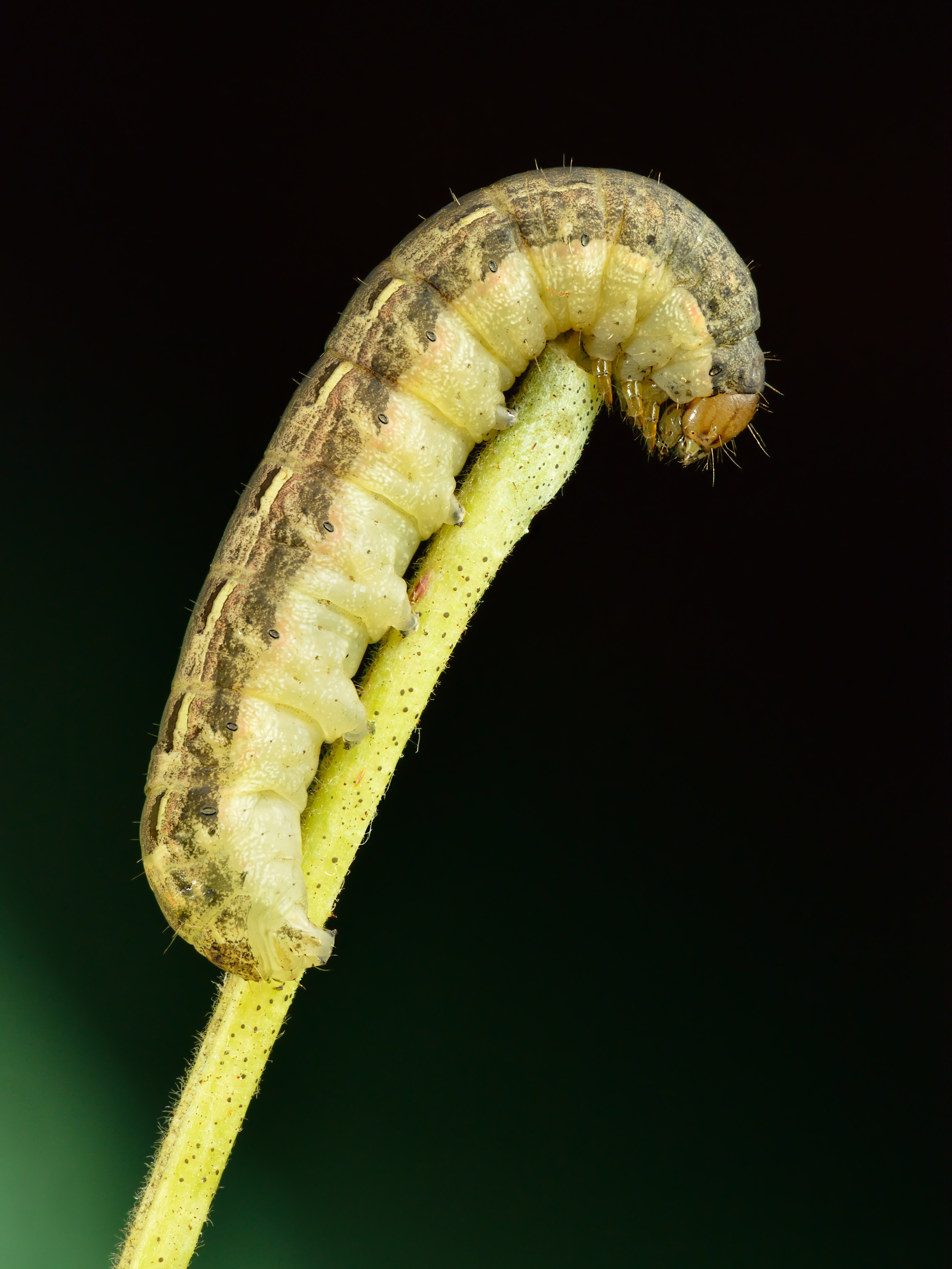
Caterpillar

The large yellow underwing (Noctua pronuba) is a moth, the type species for the family Noctuidae. It is an abundant species throughout the palearctic, one of the most common and most familiar moths of the region. In some years the species is highly migratory with large numbers appearing suddenly in marginal parts of the range.

== Description and life cycle ==
Adults have a wingspan of around 45-55 mm. The patterns and colours on the forewings vary widely by specimen, though the yellow-orange underwings with a black stripe at the base remain consistent.

As with other Noctua species (and numerous other insects), this contrast of bland-on-land and bright-in-flight is used to confuse potential predators. It will visit flowers such as Buddleia, ragwort, and red valerian.

This adult flies at night from mid to late summer and is attracted to light, sometimes in huge numbers. The larvae, of the cutworm type, can be found from late summer to early spring, feeding at night and hiding underground at day, they are green or brown with two rows of black dashes along the back.

=== Technical description and variation ===
Antennae in male ciliated. Forewings ochreous-brown to dark fuscous, sometimes reddish tinged, sometimes partly irrorated with grey-whitish, especially towards costa anteriorly; lines often paler, dark-edged, sometimes faint, subterminal preceded on costa by a blackish mark orbicular and reniform more or less pale-edged, outlined with darker, reniform partly marked with dark grey. Hindwings ochreous-orange; a blackish terminal band. Larva pale green to dull brown; dorsal line pale; subdorsal series of blackish longitudinal marks on 5-12; a pale line beneath these; subspiracular pale; head light brown, dark-marked. See Noctua orbona, the lunar yellow underwing and Noctua comes, lesser yellow underwing for differences between these species and pronuba.

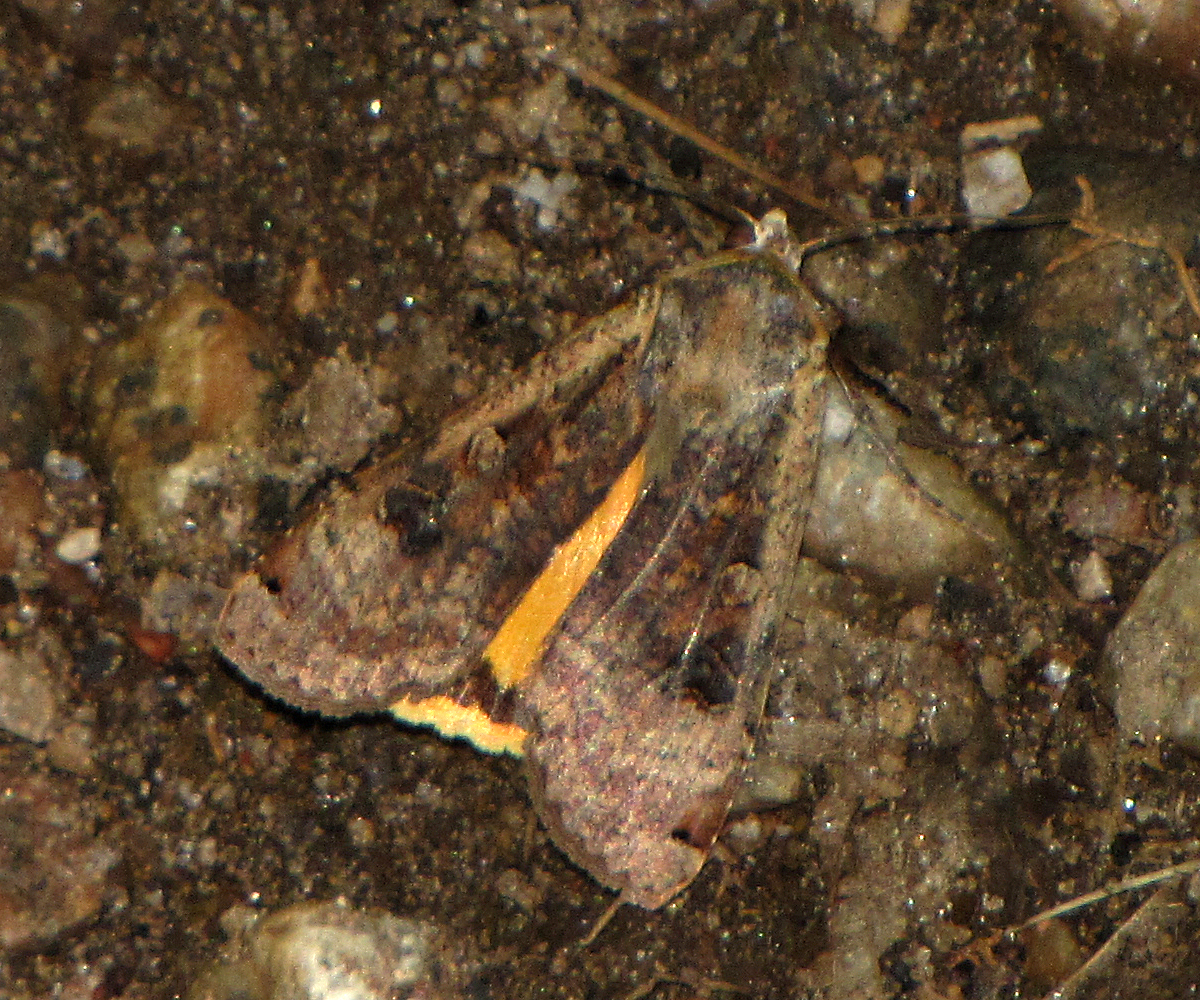
On forest floor of Gatineau Park, Quebec

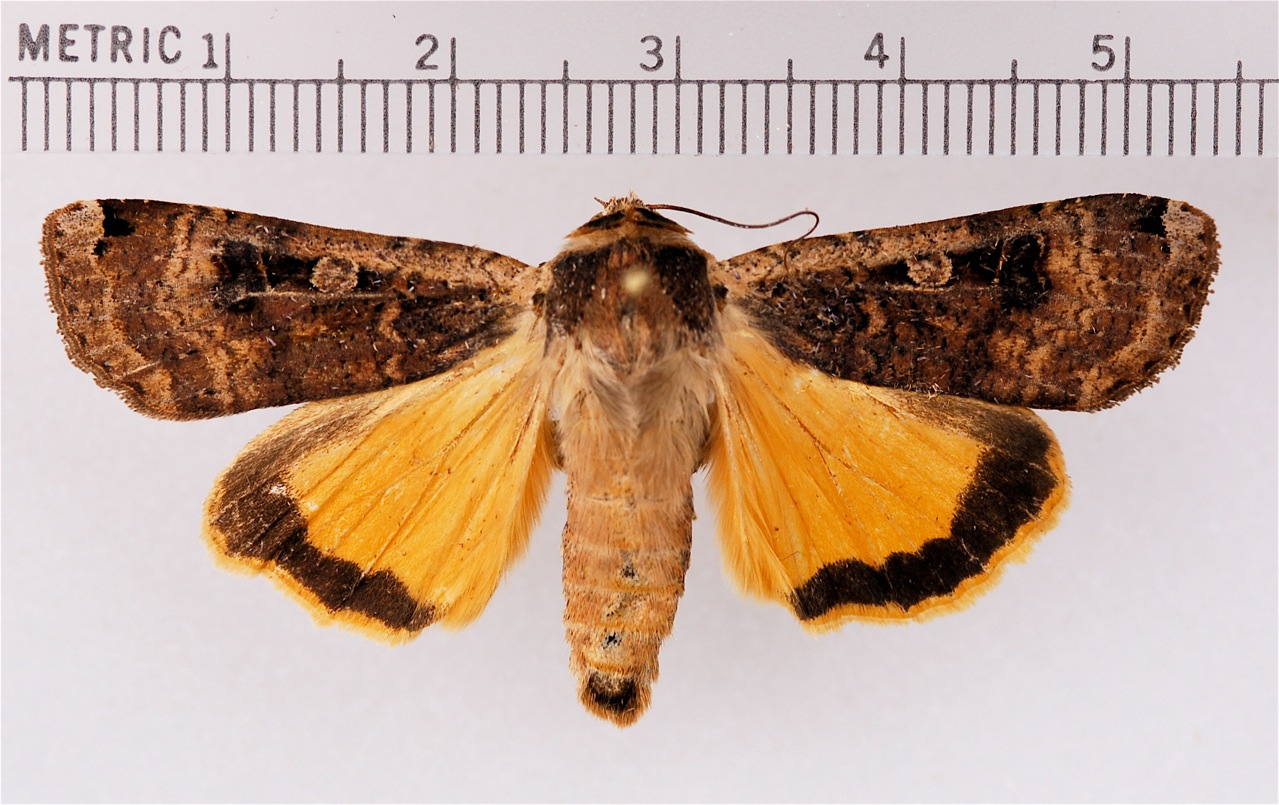
Mounted adult specimen

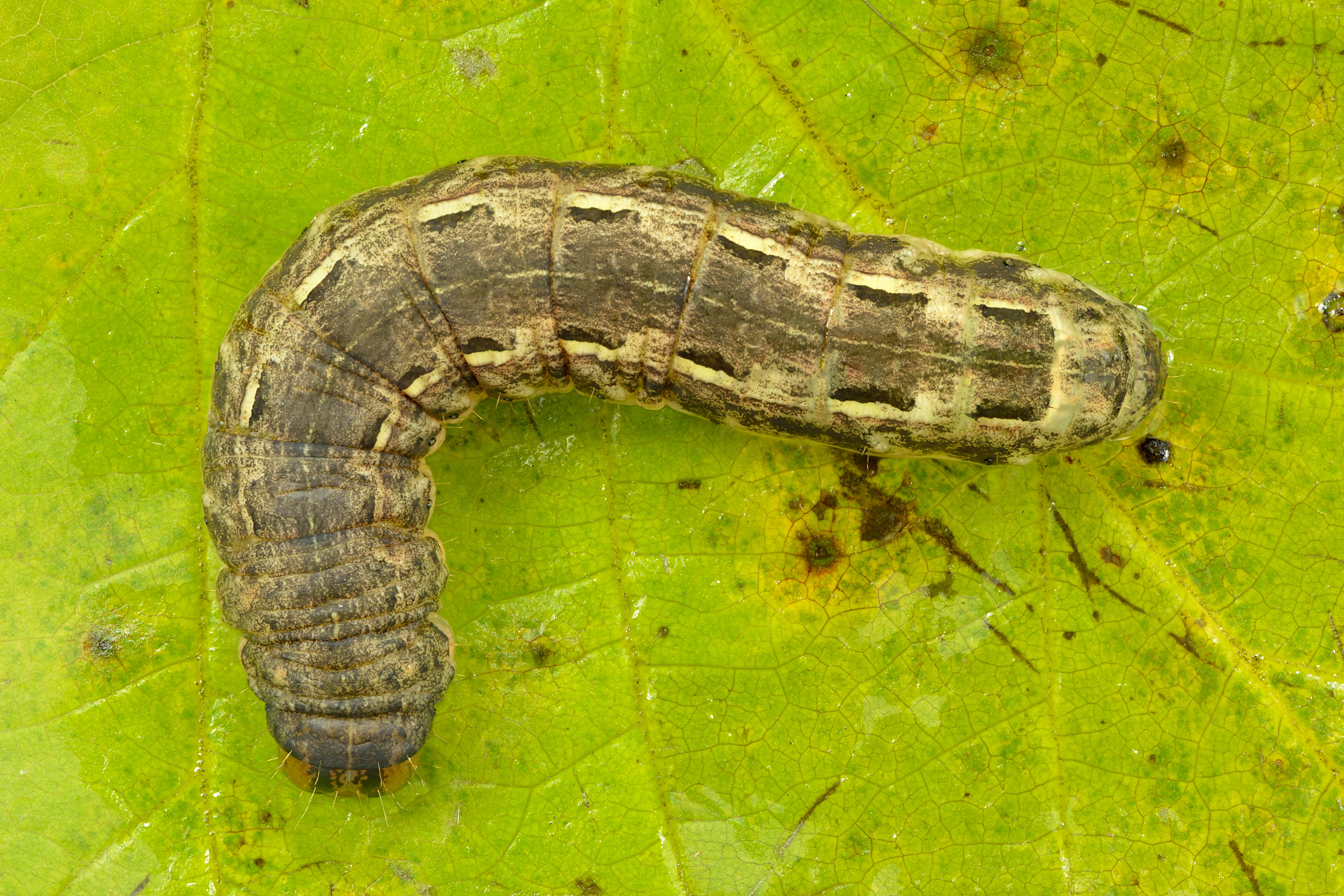
Caterpillar

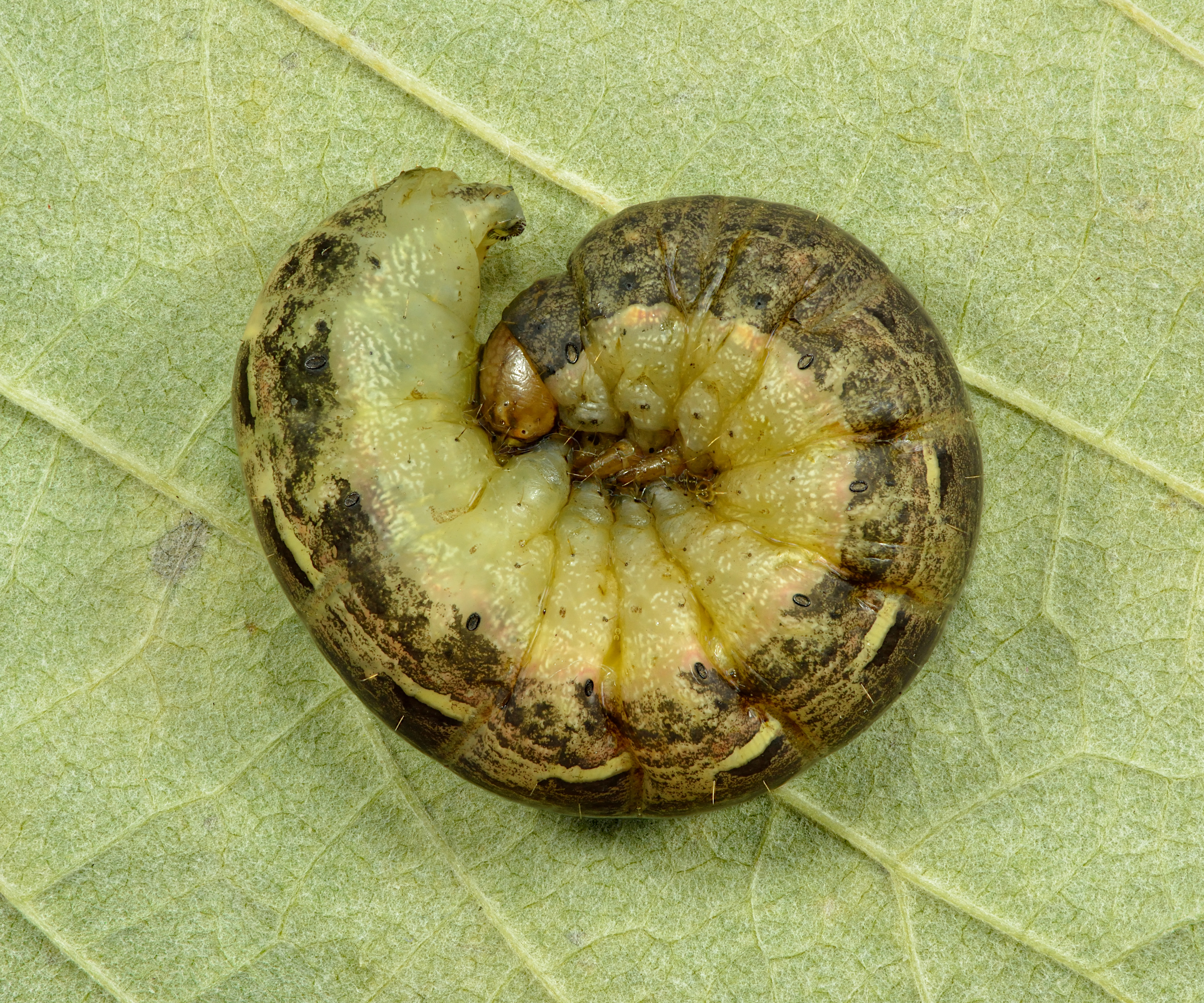
Caterpillar in defensive posture

== Distribution ==
It is present in Europe, North Africa, Canary Islands, Middle East, Turkey, Iraq, Iran, Afghanistan, northwest India, Russia, Novosibirsk Oblast, Caucasus, Transcaucasia and Central Asia. It was introduced into North America at Nova Scotia. Since then it has increased its range considerably and has been recorded for Maine since 1985, and then spread throughout the northeast from Vermont and Massachusetts (1989) to New Hampshire (1990), New York, Maryland (1992), and Connecticut (1993). It was first recorded in Pennsylvania in 1998, North Carolina (1997) and west to Colorado (1999), Wyoming (2000), Washington (2000), California (2001), British Columbia (2002) and Alaska (2005).

Numbers are often increased by large migratory influxes.

== Recorded food plants ==
- Allium
- Beta – beet
- Brassica
- Calendula – marigold
- Chrysanthemum
- Dahlia
- Daucus – carrot
- Dianthus – carnation
- Fragaria – strawberry
- Freesia
- Gladiolus
- Hieracium – hawkweed
- Lactuca – lettuce
- Lycopersicon – tomato
- Plantago – plantain
- Poaceae – grasses
- Primula
- Rhubarb
- Solanum – nightshades (including potato, pepper, and tomato plants)
- Spinach
- Taraxacum – dandelion
- Viola – sweet violet
- Vitis – grape

See Robinson, G.S. et al.

== Relationship to humans ==
=== As pests ===
The larvae are often considered pests, due to damage to garden plants and crops.
