= Micro lathe =

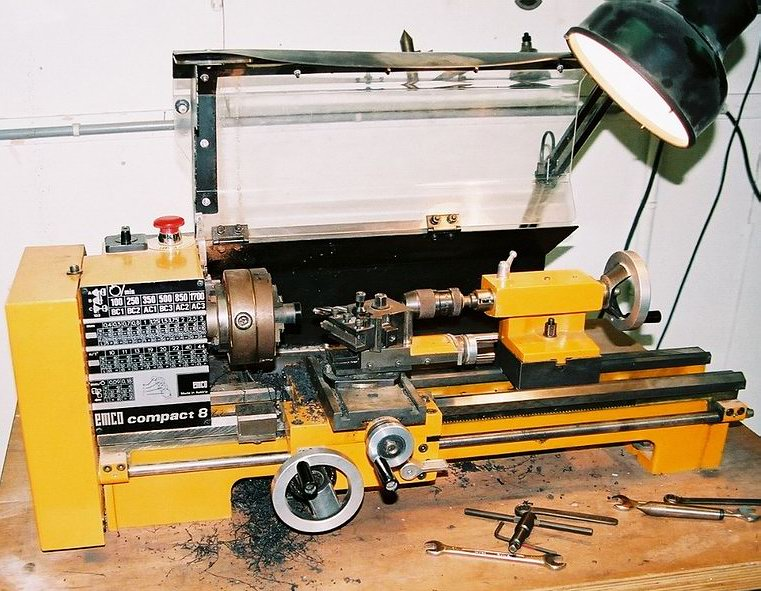

A micro lathe (also styled micro-lathe or microlathe) is a machine tool used for the complex shaping of metal and other solid materials. Micro lathes are related to (full-sized) lathes but are distinguished by their small size and differing capabilities, application, use, and locations. Sometimes referred to as desktop lathes or table-top lathes, micro lathes can be comfortably used in areas where a full-sized lathe would be impractical.

Micro lathes are well suited for use in restricted spaces where heavy machining or high accuracy are not requirements. Micro lathes find a place in homes, basements, and garages. As they are a popular tool for hobbyists, they are commonly sold through hobby catalogs and hobby websites. Micro lathes are preferred over larger lathes by some professionals, commonly locksmiths, jewelers, designers, and engineers for prototyping or fabrication work.

Despite a more available price point and lower rigidity than their larger counterparts, micro lathes still operate within the required tolerances of many tasks. This makes them particularly useful in applications where small precision pieces are needed for projects like miniature engines that require fine detail and mechanical accuracy.

Small ultra-precision and diamond turning lathes exist, but have little in common with a desktop-style micro lathe other than form factor. The smallest CNC micro lathe was made by researchers at the Mechanical Engineering Laboratory of Japan’s Ministry of Economy, Trade and Industry and Olympus Optical Co. It is 32 mm long, 25 mm wide, and 30.5 mm high, the lathe weighs just 100 grams. In test runs, the tiny lathe produced a brass needle 0.05 mm wide and 0.6 mm long and screws that are 0.05 mm thick.

== Materials ==
Micro lathes are not commonly used to cut wood. Though accessories for woodcutting are available, a reduced work envelope limits the machine to small projects and increases difficulty. A majority of micro lathes utilize a variable speed electric motor and are usually employed to turn metals such as iron, aluminum, copper, and titanium. Delrin and other free-machining plastics can be effectively cut, but others (such as Acetate and PVC) require experience and specialized knowledge of machining, and are commonly found to be difficult to machine by micro lathe users who are not professional machinists.
