= Diego Fiori =

Italian artist

Diego Fulvio Fiori, simply known as Diego Fiori (Rome, 20 October 1975) is an Italian artist, director and film producer who is mostly active in the field of Video art and particularly known for the short film The Words Hear the Light. This short was presented out of competition in 2015 at the Cannes Film Festival and awarded with the Bronze Award for Editing at the American Movie Awards.

== Biography ==
He studied at the Accademia di Belle Arti di Roma and at the Accademia di Belle Arti di Brera in Milan, where he was, among others, a student of Luciano Fabro. In addition, he followed the lessons of Giorgio Agamben at the IUAV of Venice in Italy. Fiori welcomes the affirmation of Luciano Fabro that the artist transmits his experience without pre-conceptual categories: this perspective will bring him subsequently closer to the theatre and work of Carmelo Bene and the anthropological paradigm of Ernesto de Martino. These suggestions, transferred and reinterpreted in the cinematographic field, will be fundamental also in the approach that will give to documentary filmmaking. Of particular significance for Diego Fiori are the poetics of Pedro Costa, Jean-Marie Straub, Danièle Huillet, Vittorio De Seta, Michael Glawogger and the friendship with the Italian documentarist Luigi Di Gianni. The thesis Il potere sui corpi, la potenza del corpo. L'arte come forma di resilienza, elaborated with the guidance of the art historian Giovanna dalla Chiesa, was published in 2015 with the title "Wissen Sie, das Volk fehlt – Zum Konzept der Resilienz" in the German-language magazine "Texte: Psychoanalyse. Ästhetik. Kulturkritik, with which he started a collaboration from the moment on". In the sector of Video art, he began his career in 2009 with the "Trilogy of Silence", composed by: "Donate Silence", "Birth and Death of Alter Ego" and "Last Classical Kiss", winning the Silver Award at the Laznia Centre for Contemporary Art in Poland. The "Trilogy of Silence" participated at numerous Film Festivals and Art Festivals, marking the beginning of a successful season in the production and distribution of short films in the field of Video art.

From 2007 to 2010, he was a Subject Expert at the Faculty of Social Anthropology at the University of Cassino and Southern Lazio, participating, for the visual aspects, in the research activities of the chair.

From 2010 to 2012, he was a Subject Expert at the Faculty of Sculpture at the Accademia di Belle Arti di Frosinone. In 2016 the documentary film The Children of the Noon, co-directed with the filmmaker Olga Pohankova, was presented at the St. Louis International Film Festival in the US, In April 2017 it was awarded with the Coup de cœur du jury at the Festival International du Film Panafricain de Cannes. The short version of the documentary film was transmitted by Rai 3 on 31 August 2017 within the Doc3 format.

Since 2017, Diego Fiori has been a member of the Associazione Italiana Scenografi Costumisti Arredatori (Italian Production Designers, Costume Designers and Set Decorators Guild).

== Filmography (selection) ==
=== Short films ===
- Last Classical Kiss (Trilogy of Silence) (2009)
- Birth and Death of Alter Ego (Trilogy of Silence) (2009)
- Donate Silence (Trilogy of Silence) (2009)
- Rebus (2011)
- Ciao Vettor! (2013)
- 1+1 = una más (2014)
- The Words Hear the Light (2015)
- L'enigma del tempo (2017)

=== Feature films ===
- Fiori di Strada – We Are Not the Crazy (2015) – producer
- The Children of the Noon (2016)

== Main exhibition activities ==
His works are internationally recognised and have been exhibited in numerous galleries and festivals such as:

- MUSAE – Museo Urbano Sperimentale d'Arte Emergente, Milano (2010);
- Museo Nacional Centro de Arte Reina Sofía, Madrid (2011);
- Ibn Arabi International Film Festival, Murcia (2011);
- New Museum Los Gatos, Los Gatos (2012);
- Museo de Arte Latinoamericano de Buenos Aires, Buenos Aires (2012),;
- Armory Center for the Arts, Pasadena(2013),;
- El Paso Museum of Art, El Paso (2014);
- International Film Petry Festival, Atene (2014);
- MAXXI - National Museum of the 21st Century Arts, Roma (2015);
- Berlin Short Film Festival, Berlino (2015);
- Aesthetica Art Prize, York (2015);
- Shchusev Museum of Architecture, Mosca (2015);
- Mykonos Biennale, Mykonos (2015);
- Arquiteturas Film Festival, Lisbona (2015);
- Tehran University of Art, Teheran (2016),
- Bauhaus-Universität Weimar, Weimar (2016);
- New York International Independent Film and Video Festival, New York (2016);
- University of Oradea – Faculty of Arts, Oradea (2016)
- Metro-Kino (Wien)|Metro-Kino, Vienna (2016);
- Seattle's True Independent Film Festival, Seattle (2016);
- York St John University, York (2016)
- Globe International Silent Film Festival, Michigan (2017);
- Con-temporary Art Observatorium, "Vita Tua, Vita Mea" group exhibition at Venice Biennale, Italy (2017);
- Maverick Movie Awards, Hollywood, USA (2017)
- Chicago International Arthouse, Michigan, USA (2017)
- Festival de films documentaires Enfances dans le monde, Paris, France (2017)
- Barbican Centre, London (2017);

== Awards and recognitions (selection) ==
- 2010 – IN OUT Filmfestival
  - Silver Award al Best Film per Trilogy of Silence
- 2014 – Mumbai Shorts International Film Festival
  - Certificate of Excellence al Experimental per Rebus
- 2015 – International Independent Film Awards
  - Silver Award al Experimental Short Film per 1+1 = una más
- 2015 – Accolade Global Film Competition.
  - Award of Excellence al Best Experimental Film per The Words Hear the Light
- 2015 – Best Shorts Competition
  - Award of Excellence al Experimental Film per The Words Hear the Light
- 2015 – The IndieFest Film Awards
  - Award of Excellence al Best Experimental Film per The Words Hear the Light
  - Marquee Award al Best Editing per The Words Hear the Light
- 2016 – WorldFest-Houston
  - Bronze Remi Award al Independent Experimental Awards: Dramatic per The Words Hear the Light
- 2016 – Nevada International Film Festival
  - Gold Reel Award Winner per Fiori di Strada – We Are Not the Crazy
- 2016 – International Independent Film Awards
  - Gold Winner al Documentary Feature per Fiori di strada – We Are Not the Crazy
- 2016 – Canada International Film Festival
  - Royal Reel Prize al Documentary Feature Competition per Fiori di Strada – We Are Not the Crazy
- 2016 – International Euro Film Festival
  - Jury Prize al Best Social Denunciation Film per Fiori di strada – We Are Not the Crazy
- 2017 – American Movie Awards
  - Special Marquee Award per The Children of the Noon
- 2017 - Hollywood International Independent Documentary Awards
  - Award of Excellence per The Children of the Noon
- 2017 - Hollywood International Moving Pictures Film Festival
  - Documentary Feature per The Children of the Noon
- 2017 - London Film Awards
  - Best Documentary per The Children of the Noon
- 2017 - Los Angeles Independent Film Festival Awards
  - Best Producer Feature per The Children of the Noon
- 2018 - ReelHeART International Film Festival
  - Documentary Feature per The Children of the Noon
- 2018 - Amsterdam International Filmmaker Festival
  - Best Cinematography in a Feature Documentary per The Children of the Noon

== See also ==
- Video art
- Video poetry
- Experimental cinema
- Video installation
- Documentary

== Bibliography ==
- Diego Fiori; Daniela Lorenzetti (2008). First ISA Forum of Sociology (ed.). "Those Who Feels Pain Need Having Reason". Sociological Research and Public Debate. Barcelona.
- Jennifer Heath (2014). Baksun Books (ed.). Water, Water Everywhere: Paean to a Vanishing Resource. Baksun Books. ISBN 978-1-887997-30-0.
- August Ruhs (2015). Passagen Verlag (ed.). Texte: Psychoanalyse. Ästhetik. Kulturkritik. Heft 1 / 15 (in German). Vienna. ISBN 978-3-7092-0195-4.
- Federico Cherie; Sarah Perks (2015). "Future Now". Aesthetica Magazine. York. ISSN 1758-9932.
- Federico Cherie; Sarah Perks (2016). "Future Now". Aesthetica Magazine. York. ISSN 1758-9932.
- CON-temporary Art Observatorium; Jizaino (2017). "Art end Interrelations - Vita Tua, Vita Mea". Catalogue of the Exhibition. Venice.
