= Henri Fiori =

French politician (1881–1963)

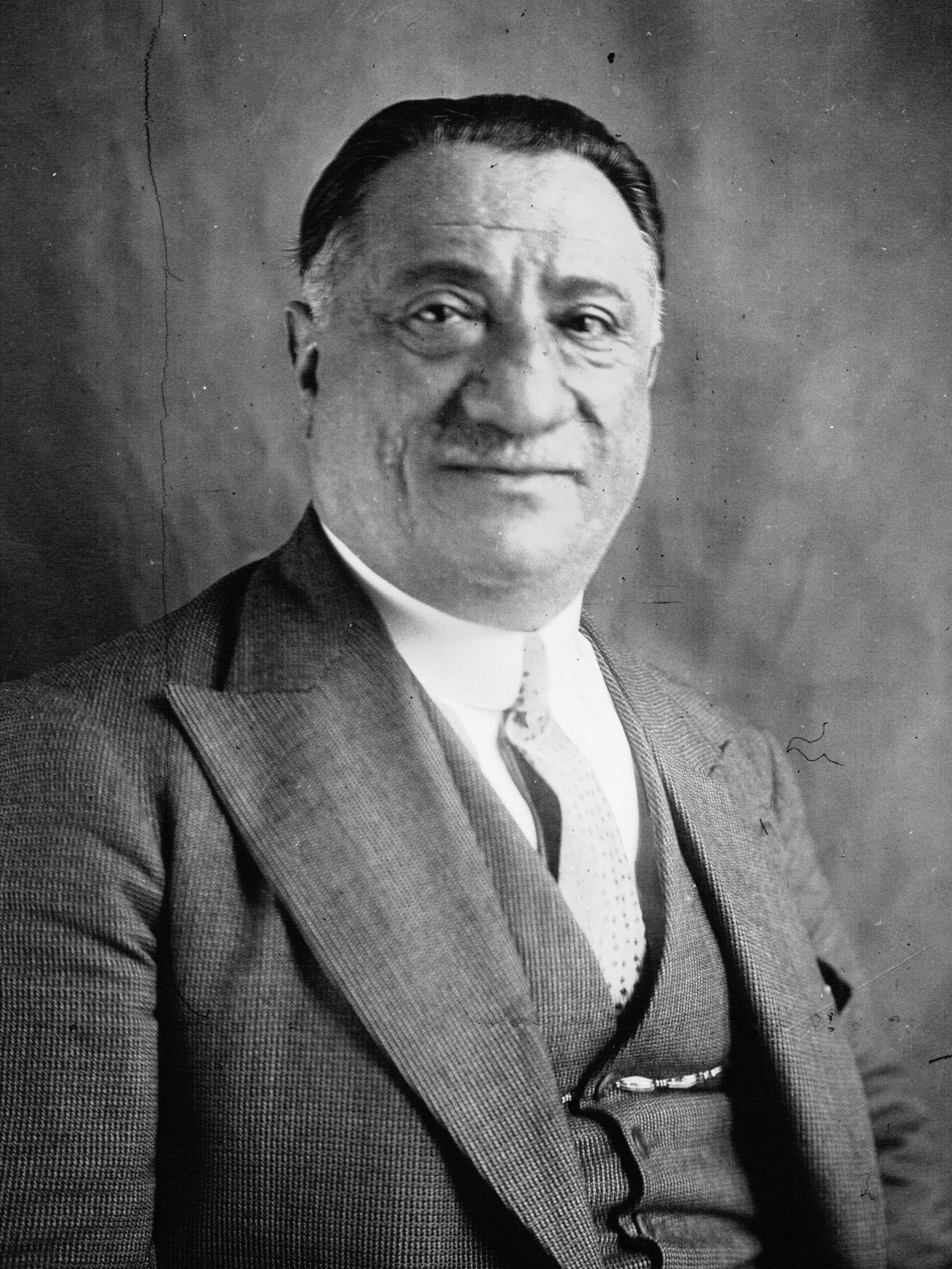
Henri Fiori 1932

Henri Fiori (20 February 1881, Algiers - 14 January 1963) was a French politician. He represented the Republican-Socialist Party (from 1919 to 1936) and the Socialist Republican Union (from 1936 to 1940) in the Chamber of Deputies.

On 10 July 1940, he voted in favour of granting the cabinet presided over by Marshal Philippe Pétain authority to draw up a new constitution, thereby effectively ending the French Third Republic and establishing Vichy France.
