= Bar puller =

A bar puller is a tool for automatically drawing in material (round tubes or solid bars) on a CNC lathe. The machined part is cut off and new material has to be fed into the machine.

== Function ==
Bar pullers are used in CNC lathes to automatically draw in bars from the clamping chuck. In this case they serve as a substitute for a bar feeder on an NC/CNC lathe.

The clamping chuck is fitted directly into the turret of the lathe or into the bar holder. There are two different versions, depending on the design: Start on the X-axis (starting from the radius) or start on the Z-axis (direction of the spindle).

A bar feeder magazine and workpiece stop are not required when a bar puller is used.

== Material ==
The housing can be made of aluminium or steel, the top jaws are made of case-hardened steel, tempered steel and burnished.

== History ==
The history of the bar puller begins with the introduction of the NC/CNC lathes in around 1980. At this time lathes were changed to permit inexpensive and economical production of small or medium-sized batches.

The bar puller serves to draw bars into the lathe without operators having to feed the machine with material each time it is required. With the introduction of CNC (Computerized Numerical Control) for the lathes it was possible to ensure the reliability of the individual process operations (moving the turret to the material, opening the clamping chuck, drawing in the material, closing the clamping chuck, moving the turret away with the bar puller).
