= Fiori (pasta) =

Type of pasta

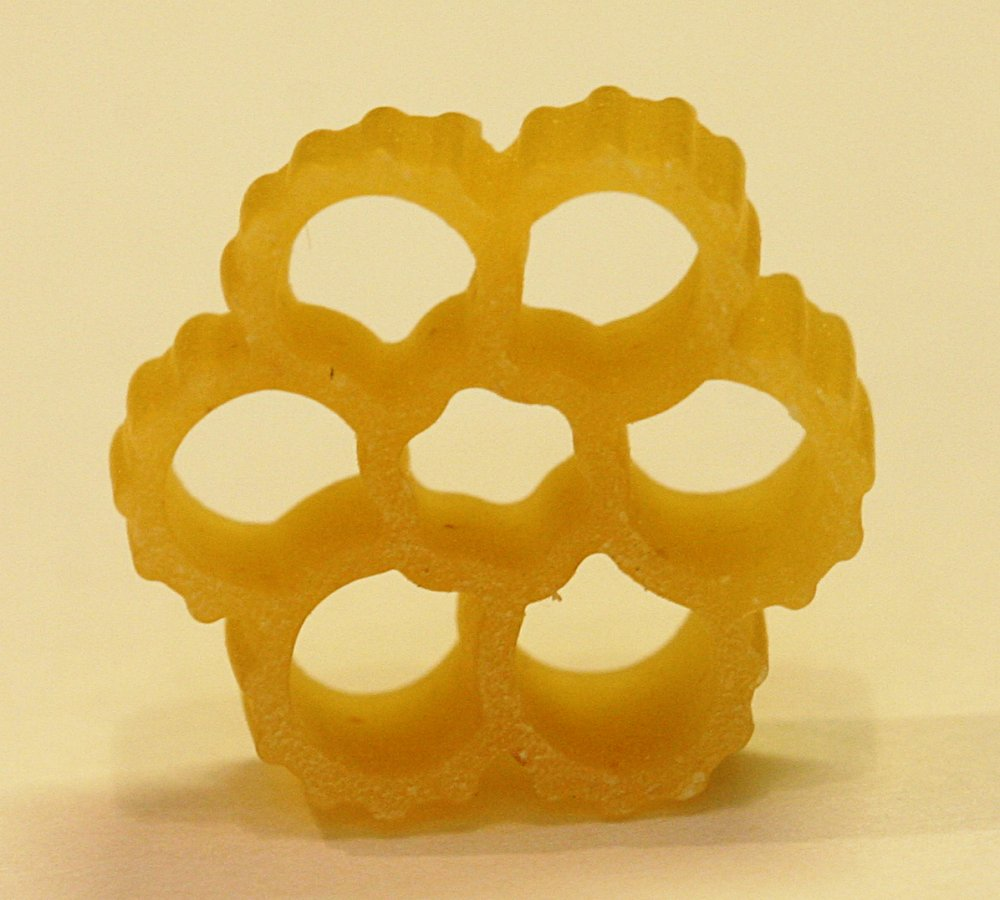
- Type: Pasta
- Place of origin: Italy
- Main ingredients: Durum or Common wheat

Fiori (/fiˈɔːri/, Italian: [ˈfjoːri]; lit. 'flowers') is a decorative shape of extruded pasta, similar to rotelle.

== See also ==
- List of pasta
