= Attilio Fiori =

Italian entomologist

Attilio Fiori (18 January 1883, Catanzaro – 6 November 1958, Bologna) was an Italian entomologist who studied Lepidoptera.

He wrote 1930 Lepidotteri di Rodi Mem. Soc. Ent. Ital., Vol. IX. 1930, pp. 196–214.with Emilio Turati. His collection is in Museo Civico di Storia Naturale di Milan.
