= Emilio Turati =

Italian entomologist (1858–1938)

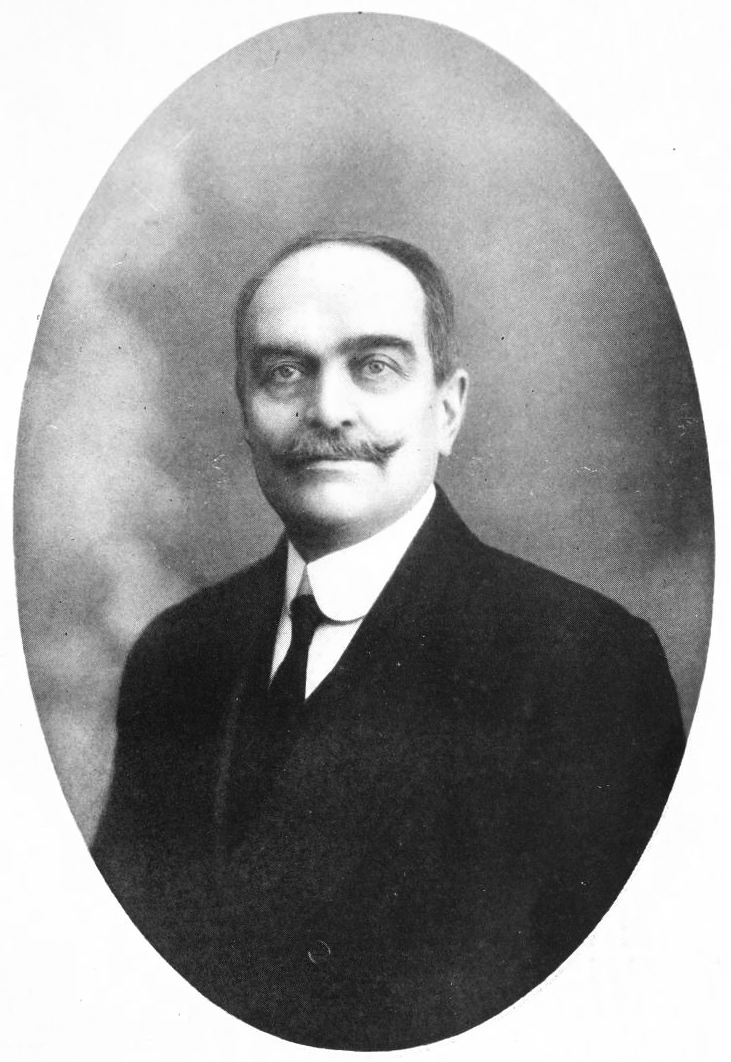
Emilio Turati in 1915

Emilio Turati (27 October 1858 – 23 September 1938) was an Italian entomologist who specialised in Lepidoptera. He is not to be confused with Ernesto Turati and Gianfranco Turati.

Count Emilio Turati wrote 67 scientific papers mainly on the Lepidoptera of Italy and the Mediterranean area. He described many new taxa. Turati was a friend of Attilio Fiori. His collection is shared between the Turin Museum of Natural History, Tyrolean State Museum and the Natural History Museum London.
