= Down-the-hole drill =

Jackhammer-like tip for drilling deep into rock

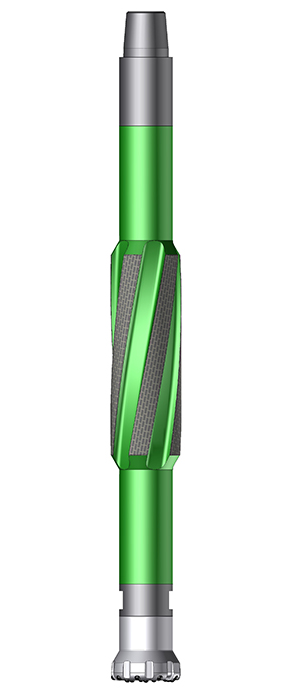
DTH drill tool operated with drilling mud (Drillstar MUDHammer)

A down-the-hole drill, usually called DTH by most professionals, is basically a jackhammer screwed on the bottom of a drill string. The fast hammer action breaks hard rock into small cuttings and dust that are evacuated by a fluid (air, water or drilling mud). The DTH hammer is one of the fastest ways to drill hard rock. The system is thought to have been invented independently by Stenuick Frères in Belgium and Ingersoll Rand in the USA in the mid-1950s.

== Origin of the name ==
DTH is short for “down-the-hole”. Since the DTH method was originally developed to drill large-diameter holes downwards in surface-drilling applications, its name originated from the fact that the percussion mechanism followed the bit down into the hole. Applications were later found for the DTH method underground, where the direction of drilling is generally upwards instead of downwards.

== Technical details ==
In DTH drilling, the percussion mechanism – commonly called the hammer – is located directly above the drill bit. The drill pipes transmit the necessary feed force and rotation to the hammer and the bit, along with the fluid (air, water or drilling mud) used to actuate the hammer and flush the cuttings. The drill pipes are added to the drill string successively behind the hammer as the hole gets deeper.

The hammer is fully fluid actuated. It is composed of two mobile parts: a valve, controlling the flow and a piston that strikes on an impact surface directly linked to the bit. The hammer body gives straight and stable guidance of the drill bit.

There are three types of hammers, depending on the actuation fluid:

- Air hammers have first been developed to drill hard rock but are limited to shallow holes (< 200m);
- Water hammers have been developed by a swedish company called Wassara. A lost water flow (between 55 and 744 L/min, depending on the hammer size) is necessary to actuate the hammer. It allows better performance (borehole control) and can drill deeper than air hammers;
- Hammers operated with drilling mud are currently developed by a French company called Drillstar Industries. They present the advantage of being able to drill on every existing rig using classical mud composition. Their ability to drill deep makes it a good technology to drill hard rock encountered in deep geothermal projects. An undergoing research project called ORCHYD, funded by the European Union (EU) under the Horizon 2020 programme will develop a new drilling technique, fully fluid driven, that combines the DTH mud hammer with a high pressure water jet system that cuts grooves in the rock along with the percussive action. That will help cut the rocks at greater depths in an efficient and safe manner, reducing the operational time for geothermal exploration and thus the total cost to utilize the geothermal energy.

== History ==
A pneumatic tool is first thought to have been used for rock drilling in 1844. Many quarries used hand held tools that required the driller to suspend himself from a rope over the quarry face in order to place the drill hole in the required position. This system used small diameter holes and was not only terribly inefficient, but very dangerous due to flying rock as a result of the inaccuracy of the drilled borehole.

Some quarries used primitive top hammer machines that carried the jackhammer on a mast - the slenderness of the drill rods working with a relatively large diameter drill bit caused bore holes to deviate which sometimes meant that a bore hole might finish dangerously close to its neighbour or indeed be closer to the face of the quarry than had been intended. In any event boreholes that are not aligned correctly which are then loaded with high explosive can be extremely dangerous, resulting in rock being projected beyond the intended site.

Larger quarries used big rotary machines that required huge amounts of down thrust and high rotation speeds to drive the tri-cone bit hard enough to crush the rock. This system could not be successfully used for holes below 6 inches (150mm) and the machines were very expensive to buy and to run. Another system in use was the very primitive cable tool machine (or bash and splash as it was known by the drillers) which caused a heavy bar and chisel to be lifted and dropped on the rock to crush it whilst water was introduced to create a slurry, which in the process, enabled the hole to be drilled. This system could not guarantee a finished hole size and only pure vertical holes could be drilled as the system basically relied on gravity. Debris from the hole was baled out using a baling tube with a clack valve, which was periodically dropped on a winch to capture the slurry, which was then brought to the top of the hole to be discharged.

It was only when the DTH system came along that many of the problems associated with the other systems were overcome - with the DTH system the energy source is constantly behind the drill bit, the drill tubes (or drill string) are rigid being only slightly less in diameter than the drill bit, copious amounts of air can be passed through the drill string to operate the DTH Hammer which is then used to efficiently flush the bore hole clean. DTH did not require heavy down thrusts or high rotational speeds and as such a light, cheap machine could be employed to carry out the drilling process - the machine could also be worked by one man, whereas some other systems required two operatives. The benefits that DTH brought to the industry were enormous - for the first time a drill hole could be placed where it was required because DTH gave a truly aligned, straight, accurately placed, clean bore hole that could be easily charged with explosive to provide good control over the blasting process that was safer and which provided good fragmentation of the rock. Holes could be drilled to increasing depths without the loss of performance since the energy source was always directly behind the drill bit. The system was able to drill in almost all rock conditions that other systems were unable to do. Quarry faces became safer, well profiled and quarry floors were level and easier for loading equipment to operate and move across. Much higher penetration rates could be achieved by using DTH hammers which decreased the drilling Cost per Meter in smaller hole diameters.

The DTH system completely revolutionised the blast hole industry with many quarries embracing it with open arms. Eventually the larger DTH systems then found their way into other applications, such as water well drilling and construction work.

It still offers the same benefits to the operator that it initially brought to the quarry industry but it is now being used in many different applications such as gold exploration, ground consolidation, geo-thermal drilling, shallow oil and gas well, directional and piling. The advent of tungsten carbide for the drill bits (the first bits were all-steel) and the development of the button drill bit coupled with the introduction of high air pressures (25 bar plus) has meant that the DTH system can compete easily and efficiently with other drilling systems.

DTH tools were used to locate the trapped miners in Chile and enabled food, water, and medicine to be passed to them and communication systems to be set up that eventually led to their safe rescue.

== Uses ==
DTH products can be used in the following applications:

- Mining- drill and blast holes in open pit mining, where the drill operator will drill several holes, then fill with explosives and detonate to lift rock allowing access to ore body
- RC- mineral exploration and pit grade control (needs specialized reversed circulation hammers)
- RAB - rotary air blast - mineral exploration using a conventional DTH hammer
- GW - geothermal bore holes and waterwells
- Oil and Gas - Deepwell bore holes: air hammers can be used as long as cutting uplift and borehole stability are ensured. For deeper wells, new DTH technologies including water hammer and mudhammer can be used to improve drilling rates in hard rocks.
- Construction industry - Piling, footings, soil nailing

== See also ==
- Deep hole drilling in manufacturing
