= Rehbinder effect =

Physical effect of surfactants on materials

In physics, the Rehbinder effect is the reduction in the hardness and ductility of a material, particularly metals, by a surfactant film. The effect is named for Soviet scientist Piotr Aleksandrovich Rehbinder, who first described the effect in 1928.

A proposed explanation for this effect is the disruption of surface oxide films, and the reduction of surface energy by surfactants.

The effect is of particular importance in machining, as lubricants reduce cutting forces.
