= Dip slide =

Method to test for microorganisms in liquids

A dip slide (or dipslide) is a test for the presence of microorganisms in liquids. The use of dip slides is the method most frequently used to measure and observe microbial activity in liquid-based systems. It is often used in testing cooling systems. Dip slides are often used to determine the presence of slime forming bacteria in cooling & industrial water systems. The Health and Safety Executive's (HSE) recommends the use of dipslides to monitor the general activity of aerobic bacteria. The dip slide test consists of a sterile culture medium on a plastic carrier that is dipped into the liquid to be sampled. The culture is then incubated, allowing for microbial growth. Most Dip slides consist of 1 - 2 agars attached to a flexible plastic paddle, this allows full contact of the agar onto the desired area for testing. Most Dipslides come in a circular clear shatterproof tube that can be inserted into a dip-slide incubator.

== Method ==
Most Dip slides are incubated at 30 °C for 48 hours after being dipped into the sample to ensure that the results are accurate. Some dipslides require different temperatures and incubation times depending on the type of agar used, and which organism is being tested for. After being dipped into the sample the dip slide is returned and secured in its original container for the incubation process. Multiple tests at varying periods are recommended to increase accuracy. It is important that biocides are not applied to the water prior to testing as this would significantly alter the results. The clarity of the sample is not necessarily reflective of the presence of bacteria as seemingly clear water may still have bacteria present. For some water systems a weekly dip slide test is recommended. For multiple tests the incubation period and temperature should be the same each time a new sample is assessed. Bacteria present in the sample liquid will grow and form colonies. A bacterial reference chart is used to determine the number of bacteria in the sample. Appropriate treatment is applied to the water source once abnormal levels of bacterial activity are noticed. Once water treatment is effective the bacterial count produced by the dip slide test should be low, approximately <10^{4}. Dip slides are normally used when microbiological activity is relatively high (1,000 - 100,000 CFU per milliliter of water).

The dip slide results should be used only as a guide as the accuracy of the dip slide is limited as a result of the small sample size that is analyzed and the method used to obtain results. Nevertheless, dip slides may be very useful as they are very convenient, simple to use and cost effective.
