= Gun drill =

Type of cutter or machine tool for deep hole drilling

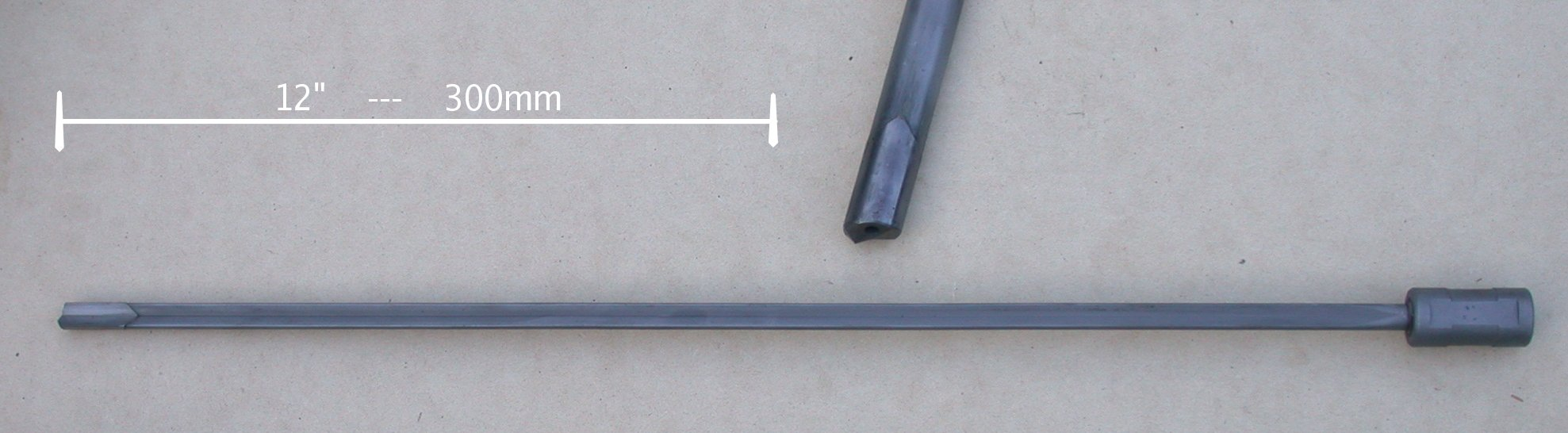
A 12 mm × 640 mm gun drill and carbide tip of 25 mm drill.

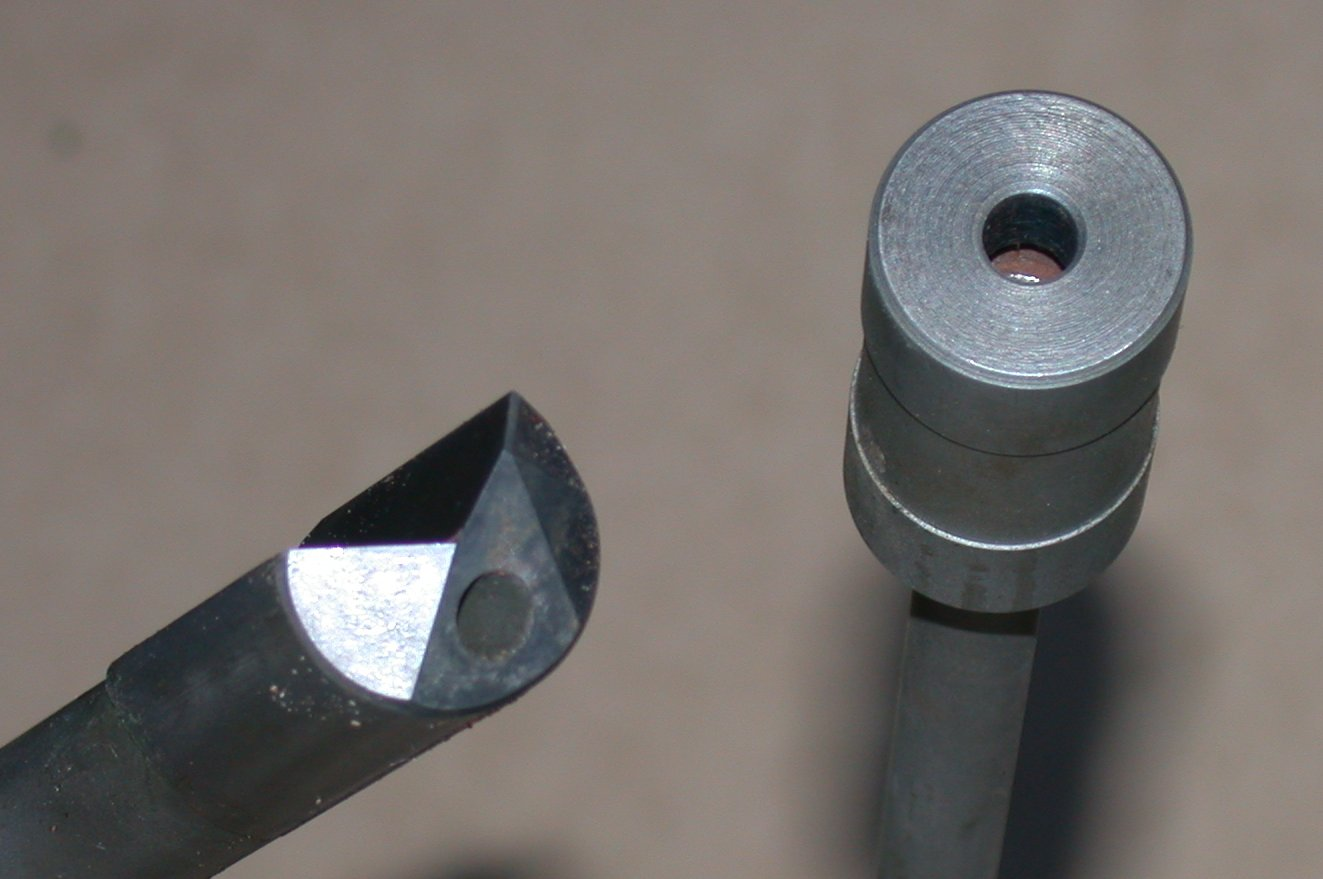
Coolant holes in tip and base of gun drill.

Gun drills (through coolant drill) are straight fluted drills which allow cutting fluid (either compressed air or a suitable liquid) to be injected through the drill's hollow body to the cutting face. They are used for deep hole drilling—a depth-to-diameter ratio of 300:1 or more is possible. Gun barrels are the obvious example; hence the name.

== Application ==
Uses include moldmaking, diemaking, and the manufacture of combustion engine parts such as crankcase, cylinder head, and woodwind musical instruments, such as uilleann pipes, as gun drills can drill long straight holes in metal, wood, and some plastics.

The coolant provides lubrication and cooling to the cutting edges and removes the swarf or chips from the hole. Modern gun drills use carbide tips to prolong life and reduce total cost when compared with steel tips. Speed of drilling depends on the material being drilled, rotational speed, and the drill diameter; a high speed drill can cut a hole in P20 steel at 75 centimeter (30 inches) per minute.

Gun drilling can be done on several kinds of machine tools. On lathes, it is generally practical with hole depths of less than 50 centimeters. There are also purpose-built gun drilling machines, where longer aspect ratios can be drilled.

== Requirement ==
With a standard twist drill, it is difficult to drill a straight and accurately sized hole of a depth more than about 5 times the diameter. This is a problem in many manufacturing processes, especially the firearms industry: the barrel of a gun must be very straight and accurately sized. Gun barrels are far longer than their inside diameter; as an example, the .223 inches (5.7 mm) caliber barrel of the M16 rifle is 20 inches (510 mm) long, nearly 90 times the diameter of the bore. The gun drill was developed to drill such long, straight holes.

Gun drilling is possible over a range of depths and diameters. For diameters between 1–3 mm, gun drilling can be performed successfully with special equipment. It is a common process between 3–50 mm in diameter. It is also possible for the 50–75 mm range, however less efficient than BTA deep hole drilling.

== Types ==
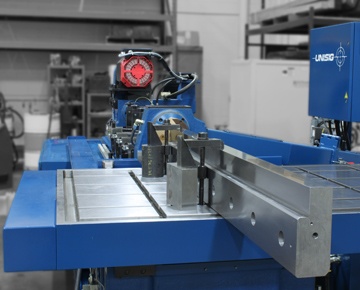
A gun drilling machine drilling holes in steel.

There are three basic types of deep hole drilling. Processes are categorized by how the cutting coolant flushes heat and chips from the cutting face. The three types of deep drilling are:

- Gun drilling - The cutting tool is a fluted solid rod that has a hole bored down the center. Coolant is pumped through a hole in the inside of the drill. It flows back outside the drill, through the flute, bringing the chips with it.
- BTA / STS (Boring and Trepanning Association / Single Tube System) - The cutting tool is a tube. Coolant is pumped in around the outside of the cutting tool and carries chips out through the center tube. For the tube to be strong enough and have an inner diameter large enough to carry chips away, the hole must be more than 5/8 inch (16 mm) in diameter.
- Ejector system - The cutting tool is a tube with another tube nested inside. Coolant flows through the smaller tube to the cutting face and then coolant and chips flow back through the larger tube. This is only an acceptable technology for holes of over 3/4 inch (19 mm) in diameter.
