= Clarity test =

Model element test in decision analysis

In decision analysis, the clarity test (or clairvoyant test) is a test of how well a model element is defined. Although nothing (outside a formal system) can be completely defined, the clarity test allows the decision participants to determine whether such elements as variables, events, outcomes, and alternatives are sufficiently well defined to make the decision at hand. In general, a model element is well defined if a knowledgeable individual can answer questions about the model element without asking further clarifying questions.

More precisely, Howard defines the clarity test by saying that a quantity or event is clearly defined—it passes the clarity test—if a "clairvoyant would be able to say whether or not the event in question occurred or, in the case of a variable, the value of the variable." Howard defines the clairvoyant as "a person who knew the future, who had access to all future newspapers, readings of physical devices, or any other determinable quantity." In later teaching Howard more broadly defined the clairvoyant as a person with perfect knowledge of all events and measurable quantities, past present and future, but no judgment.

The concept of the clairvoyant is useful in decision analysis for ensuring clarity of thought, particularly when assessing uncertainty.

The wizard is another mythical character who can change the future, usually for a fee, provided he or she is given a well-defined request. The concept of the wizard is useful for assessing deterministic preferences by eliminating the complexity added by uncertainty.

Links to a good discussion in Morgan & Henrion.

Ron Howard's 1988 article defining the test.
