= Deep hole drilling =

Drilling holes with high length-to-diameter ratios

In the field of manufacturing technology, deep hole drilling refers to the drilling of bore holes with high length-to-diameter ratios.

== Definition of deep hole drilling ==
According to the VDI Standard 3210, deep hole drilling processes are manufacturing processes for the machining of bore holes with diameters between D = 0.2...2000 mm and whose drilling depth is usually greater than three times the diameter. For small diameters, length-to-diameter ratios of up to l/D ≤ 100 can be achieved, in special cases even up to l/D = 900. With large diameters, the l/D ratio is usually limited by the travel or the bed length of the deep hole drilling machine.

== Deep hole drilling ==
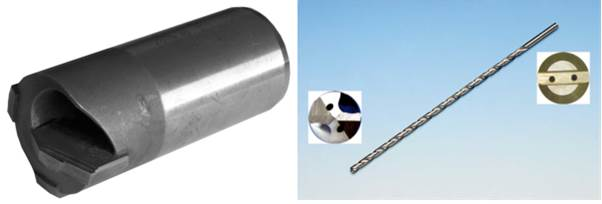
Soldered single-edged BTA solid drilling tool (left); symmetrical twist drill (right)

Deep hole drilling also differs from normal drilling in that, depending on the drilling process and the drilling diameter, cooling lubricant must be pumped to the cutting edges in large quantities and under high pressure. This ensures good cooling and at the same time good lubrication of the contact areas between the workpiece and the cutting edge of the tool on the one hand and the workpiece and guide pads of the tool on the other. In addition, the cooling lubricant continuously removes chips from the cutting zone, which makes surface-damaging and time-consuming chip removal strokes unnecessary and therefore improves the quality of the borehole and the productivity of the processes. For the production of deep holes, two different tool types are distinguished. On the one hand, there are tools with an asymmetrical single cutting-edge design. These deep hole drilling tools include single-lip deep hole drills, the single-tube system (Boring and Trepanning Association (BTA) deep-hole drilling) and the double-tube system (ejector deep-hole drilling), which are referred to as the "classic" deep hole drilling processes. On the other hand, there are tools with symmetrically arranged cutting edges. These include spiral deep hole drilling tools and double-lip deep hole drilling tools, which can also be assigned to the deep drilling processes due to the drilling depths to be achieved with them.

The mentioned tool types differ with regard to the realizable diameter range, the achievable l/D ratios, the surface quality and their productivity. Symmetrical tools can only be used in the small diameter range of D = 0.2 ... 32 mm to produce holes with an l/D ratio up to a maximum of l/D = 85, the standard is an l/D ratio of l/D = 30. With asymmetrical tools, holes in the diameter range of D = 0.5...2000 mm can be produced and the upper limit of the l/D ratio is usually limited by the machine dimensions. The figure shows selected deep hole drilling methods with their usual application diameters, whereby it becomes clear that deep hole drilling methods do not compete with each other in all diameter ranges. The advantage of the symmetrically designed tools compared to the "classical" deep hole drilling tools in the small diameter range is the feasibility of significantly higher feeds f, which can be 6 times higher compared to the usual values for single-lip deep hole drilling.

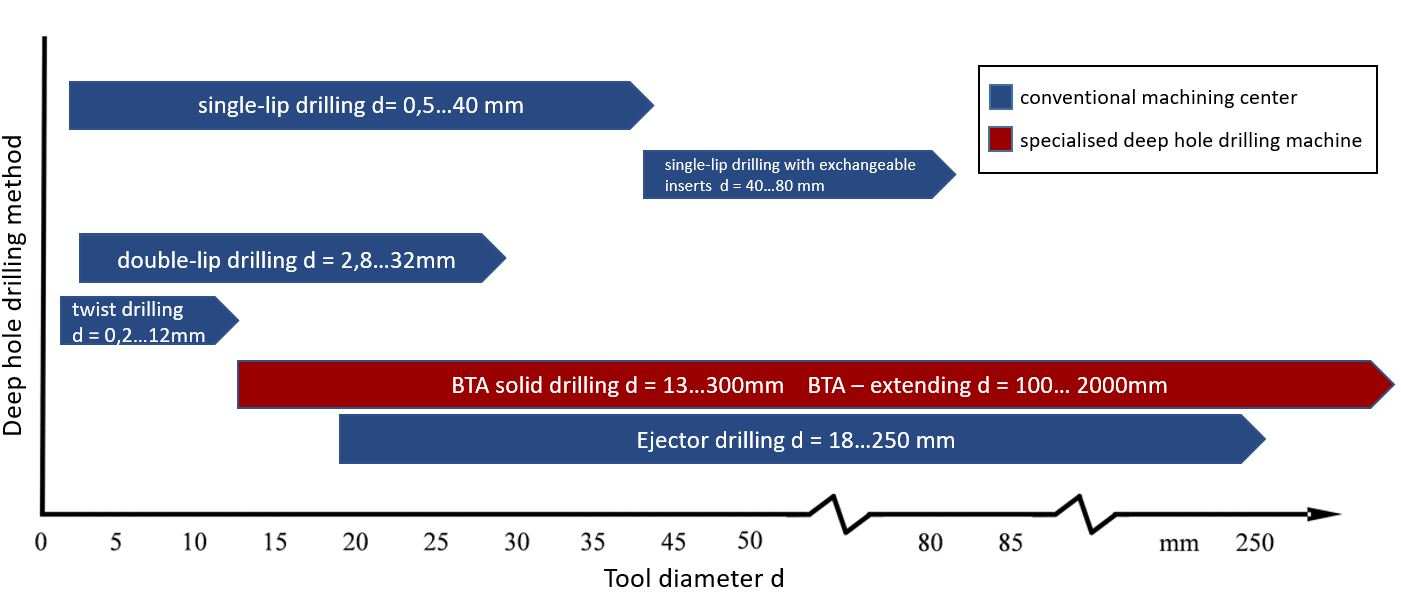
Deep hole drilling methods by tool diameter and depth range

In addition to the high l/D ratio, the "classic" deep hole drilling methods are characterized by high productivity and high surface quality compared to the conventional drilling methods with twist drills. The high drilling quality is characterized by low surface roughness, small diameter deviations and a high geometrical accuracy. Important for the good surface quality is the asymmetrical design of the deep hole drilling tools. The "classical" tools for single-lip deep hole drilling, BTA deep hole drilling and ejector deep hole drilling are, with a few exceptions, designed asymmetrically and have a secondary cutting edge (circular grinding chamfer) and guide pads. Due to this design features, a certain amount of the cutting forces during the process is transferred via the guide pads to the bore hole wall. These force components at the tool head are supported at the produced borehole wall and thus guide the tool in the bore hole itself. The distribution of the process forces during deep hole drilling is therefore different from conventional drilling, where the forces are largely absorbed by the tool shank and thus by the machine spindle. Due to the process force distribution to bore hole wall in deep hole drilling, the drill guides itself and thus the process benefits from a comparatively low straightness deviation. The "support" of the guide pads on the borehole wall also results in a forming process that (ideally) smooths the bore hole wall. Due to this forming process the surface roughness caused by the engagement of the cutting edges during drilling can be decreases by about 70%. Thus very high surface qualities with bore hole tolerances of IT 9 to IT 7 can be achieved by deep hole drilling processes. Subsequent steps to improve the surface quality of the bore hole can often be reduced or eliminated. A further advantage is the low burr formation for trough holes and for over-drilling cross holes. Due to the high surface quality combined with a high productivity, the use of deep hole drilling methods can be economical even at low drilling depths.

== Deep hole drilling methods ==
=== Single-lip deep hole drilling ===
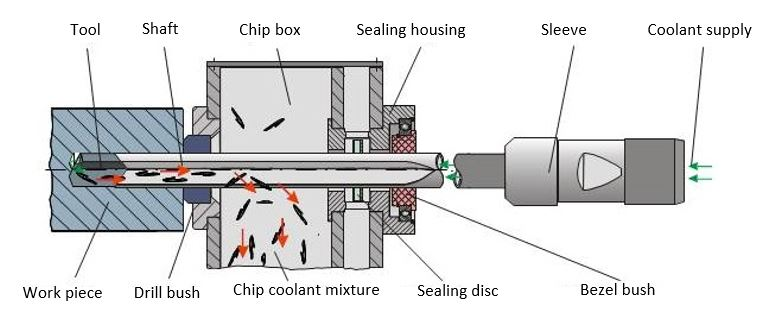
Principle of single-lip deep hole drilling

Single-lip deep hole drilling is usually used to produce holes in the diameter range of D = 0.5...40 mm. This range of application is currently limited at the lower end by the manufacturing technology to realize the coolant channels inside the tool and the increasing challenges in grinding technology with decreasing tool diameters. The upper limit results from the more economical use of alternative deep hole drilling methods. Characteristic for single-lip deep hole drilling is the internal coolant supply through one kidney-shaped or two circular cooling channels. The chip/coolant mixture is discharged in a v-shaped longitudinal groove on the tool, the so-called gullet. The coolant mass flow is the only transport mechanism for removing the chips. For this reason, a diameter-dependent high-pressure coolant supply is necessary. The general structure of single-lip tools is divided into three parts: the drill head, the shank and the clamping sleeve. Usually the drill head is joined to the shank by brazing. The clamping sleeve is the clamping element of the tool and forms the interface to the tool holder and thus to the machine tool. Solid carbide tools are often used for smaller tool diameters and tools with a high-performance design. With these more powerful tools, the drill head and the shank are made of a single carbide rod. The drill head is usually made of carbides of the ISO cutting application group K 10 to K 20 and is coated if required. In special applications, PCD, cermets, ceramics or high-speed steels are also used. The choice of the drill head geometry is made depending on the existing machining situation. In this respect, a distinction is made between different cutting edge angles and the circumferential shape of the guide pads. With the usual standard grinding for single-lip drills, the main cutting edge is divided into an outer and an inner cutting edge, which differ in different cutting edge angles depending on the bore hole diameter. The choice of the circumferential shape, i.e. the number and arrangement of the guide pads on the circumference of the single-lip drill, is also important. Compared to conventional drilling with twist drills, single-lip drilling is characterized by its suitability and high process reliability with large length-to-diameter ratios. In addition, single-lip drilling achieves comparatively high bore hole qualities, which can reduce the need for post-processing.

Tools

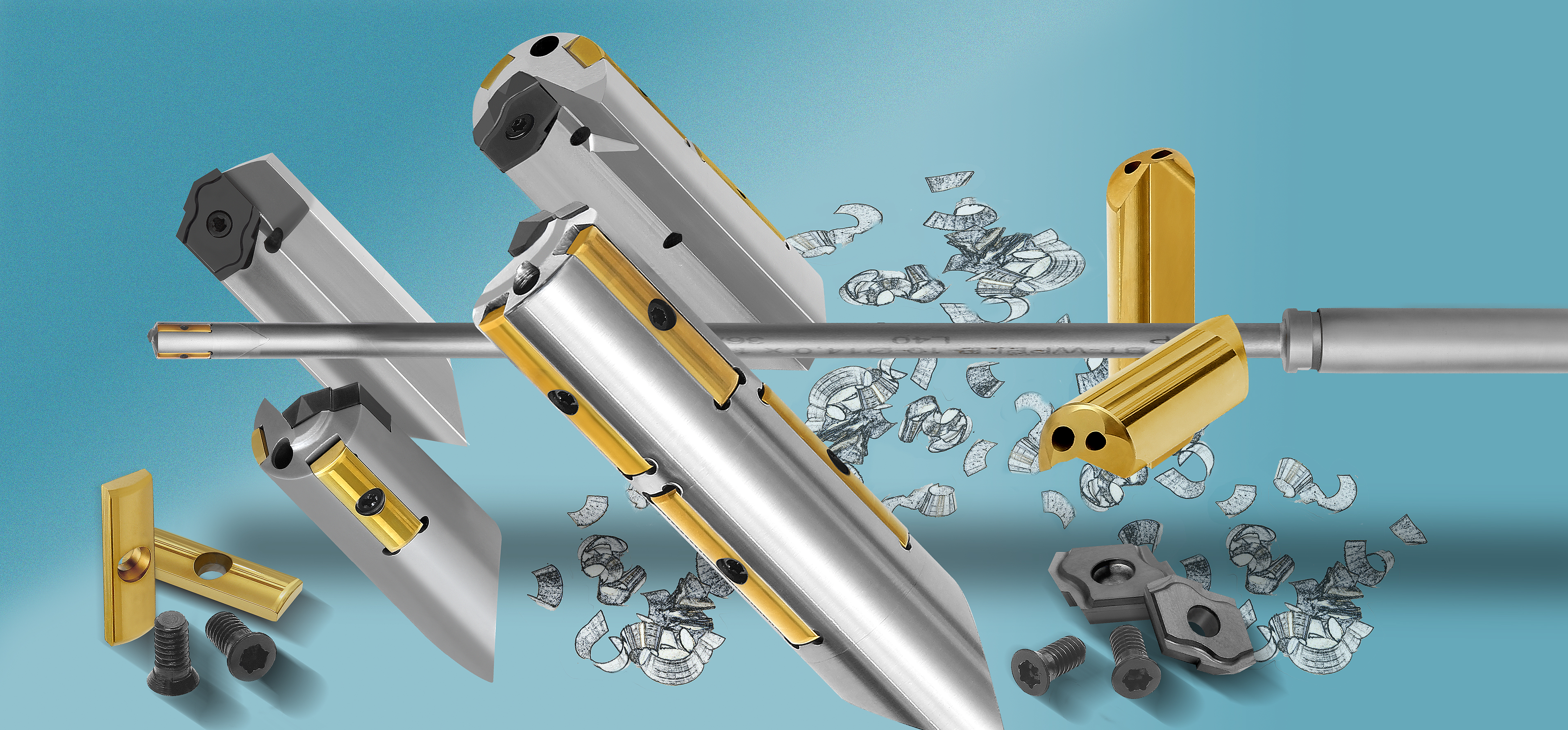
Single-lip deep hole drill with replaceable cutting edges and guiding elements

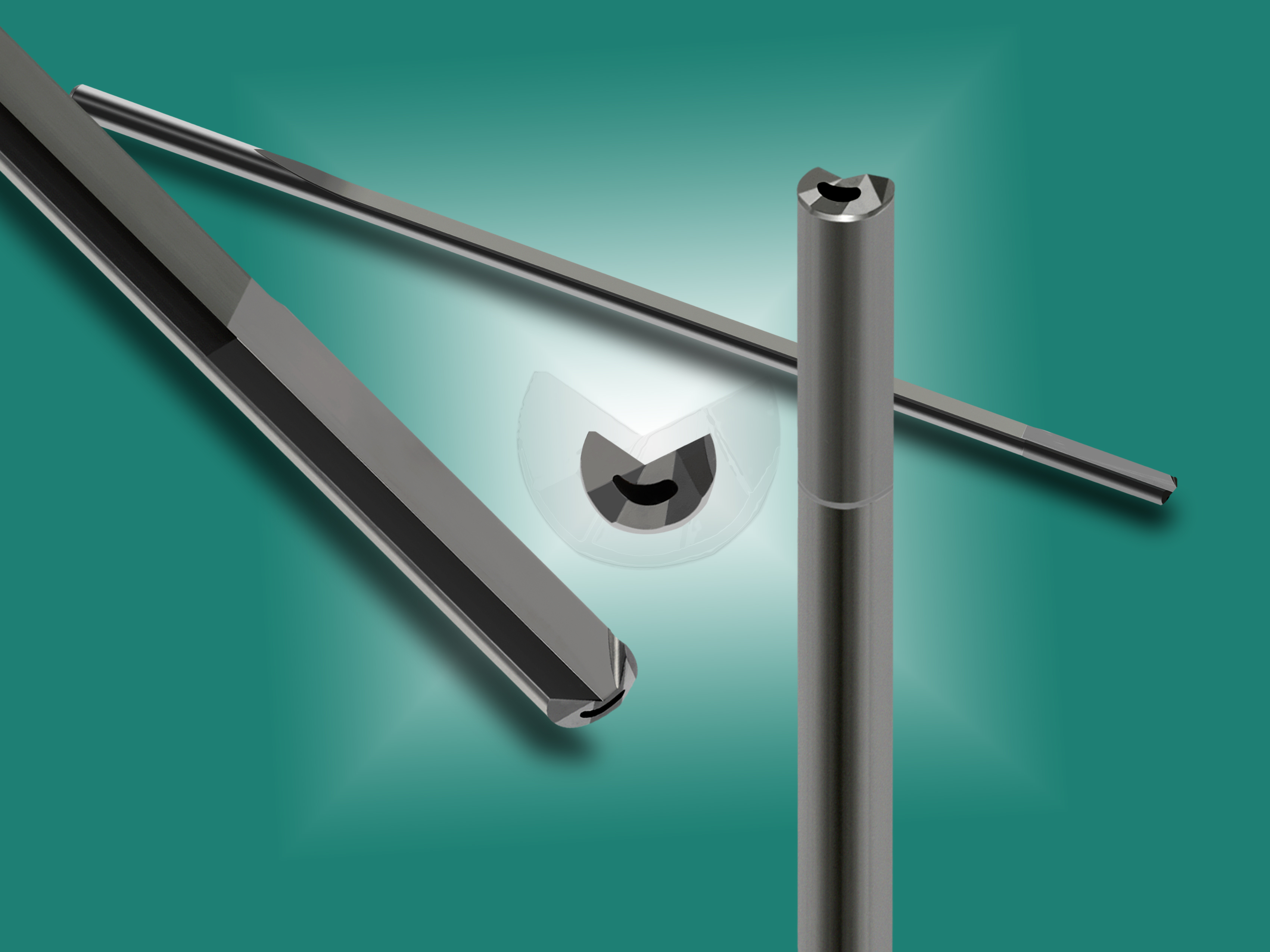
Single-lip deep hole drill made of solid carbide

As can be seen in the pictures, a single-lip deep hole drill consists of a tool holder, a shank and the drill head (usually carbide). As far as the design is concerned, it can be generally said that the shank is a few 1/10th of a millimeter to 1 millimeter smaller than the drill head. It can also be seen that approximately 1/4 of the shank consists of a grove, in which the coolant flow flushes the chips out of the bore hole. The cutting head itself carries guide surfaces which are in contact with the bore hole wall and guide the drill. Conventional twist drill on the other hand are usually guided by the axis of the machine tool.

The actual cutting edge is asymmetrically arranged and runs from the cutting edge corner via the tip to the centre of the drill. The tool thus works with a single cutting edge. The cutting forces, which are not cancelled out because of the asymmetrical design, are supported on the bore hole wall. The chips produced at the cutting edge are surrounded by coolant from the outside and then flushed away from the cutting zone through the grove in the shank. Up to a diameter of approx. 10 mm the tools have one cooling channel, for larger diameters two or more channels are used.

=== BTA deep hole drilling ===
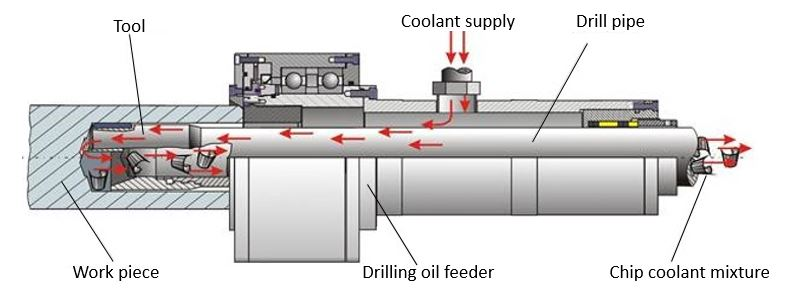
Principle of the BTA deep hole drilling method

The disadvantages of single-lip deep hole drilling, such as the contact of the chips with the generated bore hole surface or the low torsional moment, were the motivation to develop a modified deep hole drilling method that avoids these problems and retains the good properties. As a result of the above, a new deep hole drilling method was developed around 1940, which was given the name BTA deep hole drilling in the early 1950s. BTA stands for "Boring and Trepanning Association" which was dominated by the now liquidated company Gebrüder Heller in Bremen Germany. Under their leadership, the new process was created during the Second World War by combining their own developments with those of Burgsmüller and Beisner. Burgsmüller replaced the grooved drill shaft used until then by a tube with a closed cross-section, which was more torsionally rigid, and for the first time conveyed the chips through the inside of the tube. Burgsmüller used a double-edged tool and an air-oil mixture, which is nowadays used in production with minimum quantity lubrication. Beisner improved the tool design and introduced oil as cooling lubricant. Heller, which was the first company to introduce carbide-tipped single-lip deep hole drilling tools, had the patent for the cutting edge/guide pad constellation which was then also used for the BTA tools.

During the machining process, the coolant is fed to the cutting zone, as shown in the figure, through the ring gap between the hole produced and the drill tube with the aid of the drilling oil supply unit (BOZA). The BOZA also seals between the workpiece and the drill tube. For this purpose, it has a conical rotating workpiece holder which is directed towards the workpiece and is pressed against the workpiece with high pressure. This centres the workpiece and creates a sealing contact surface. In most cases, the rear side of the BOZA is sealed by a stuffing box, which also guides the drill tube. In the BOZA, the tapping bush is usually integrated, which means that working with a pilot bore hole in the BTA process is rarely necessary.

Tools

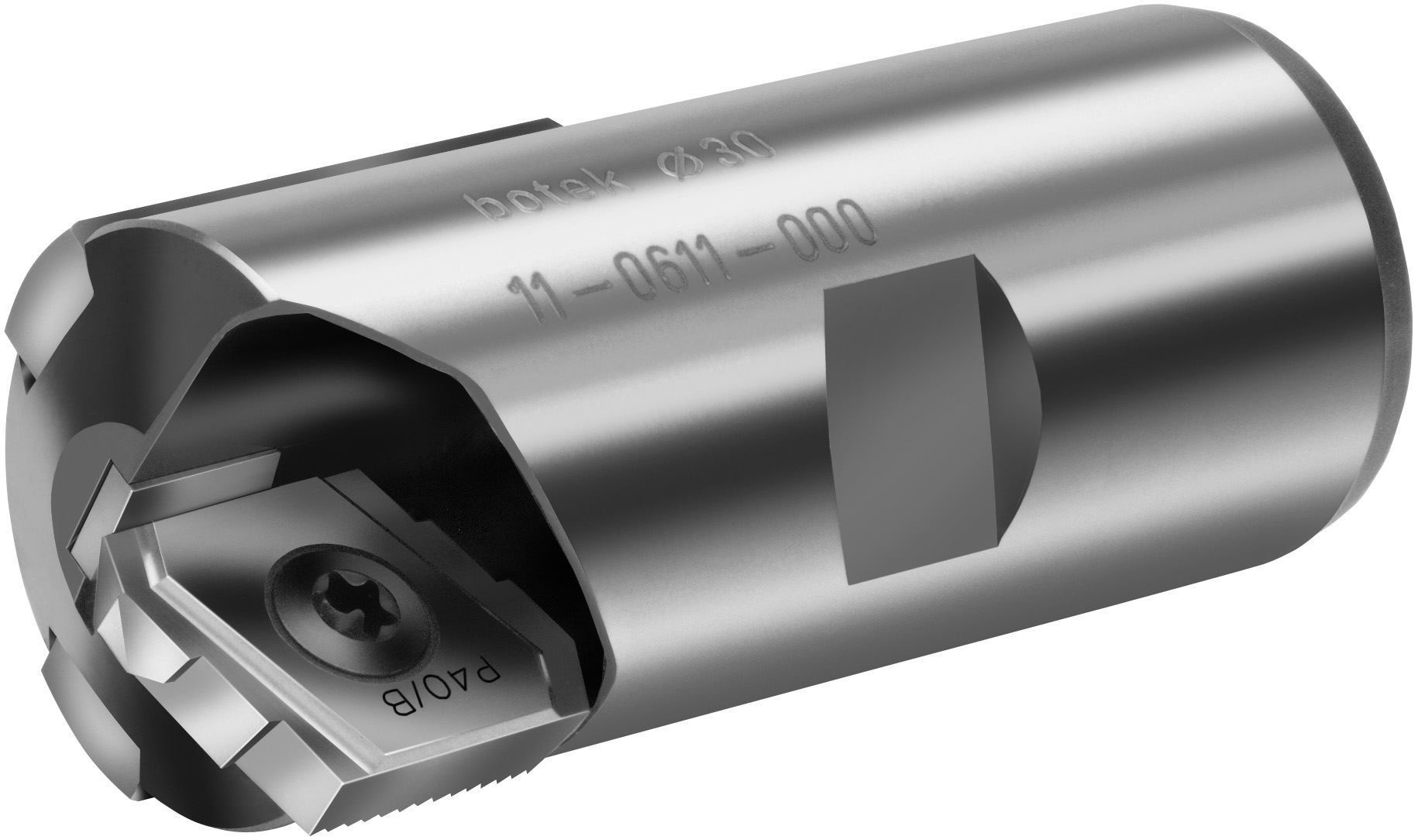
BTA deep hole drilling tool for drilling with one cutting edge from botek

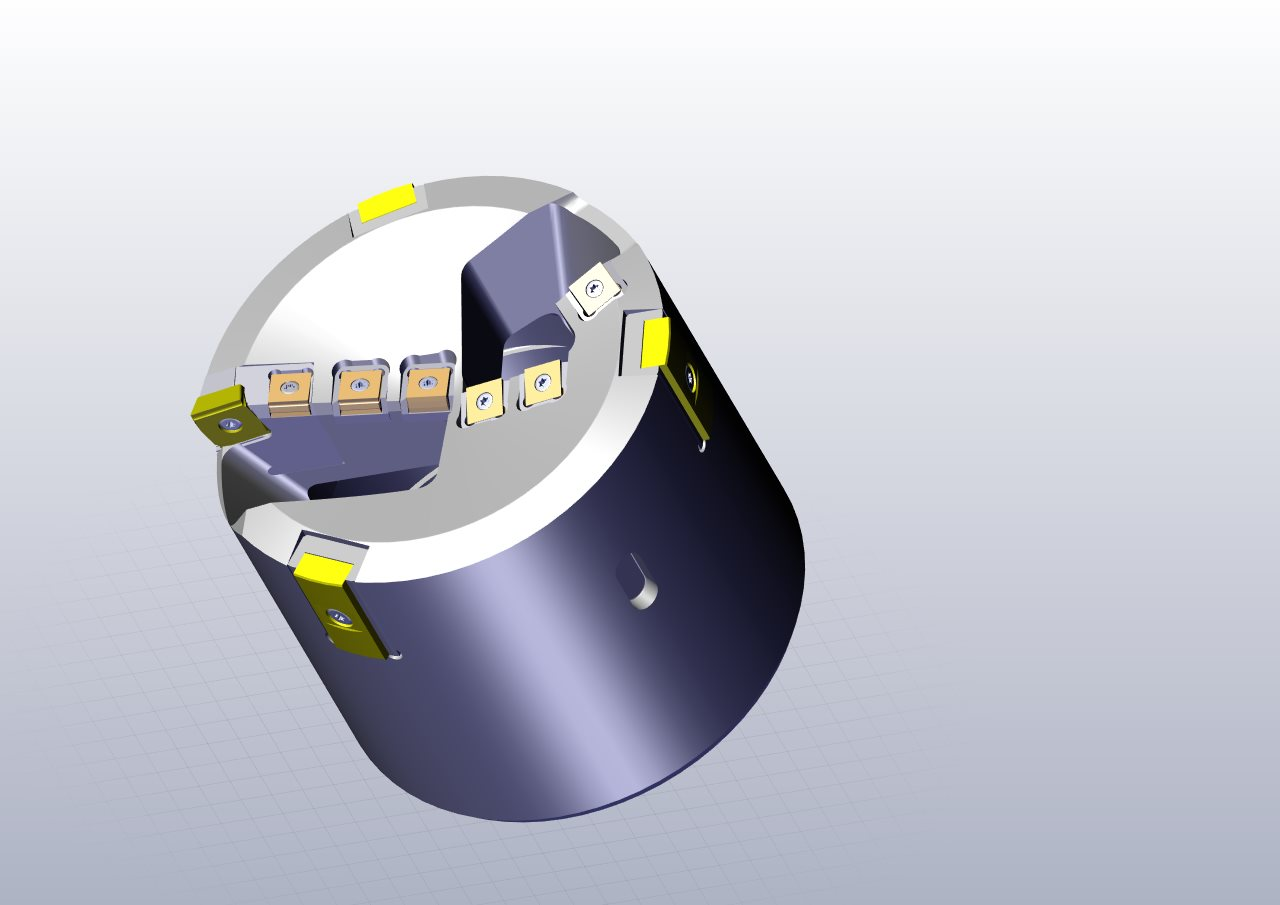
BTA deep hole drilling tool for solid drilling with split cutting edges from BTA-Tiefbohrsysteme

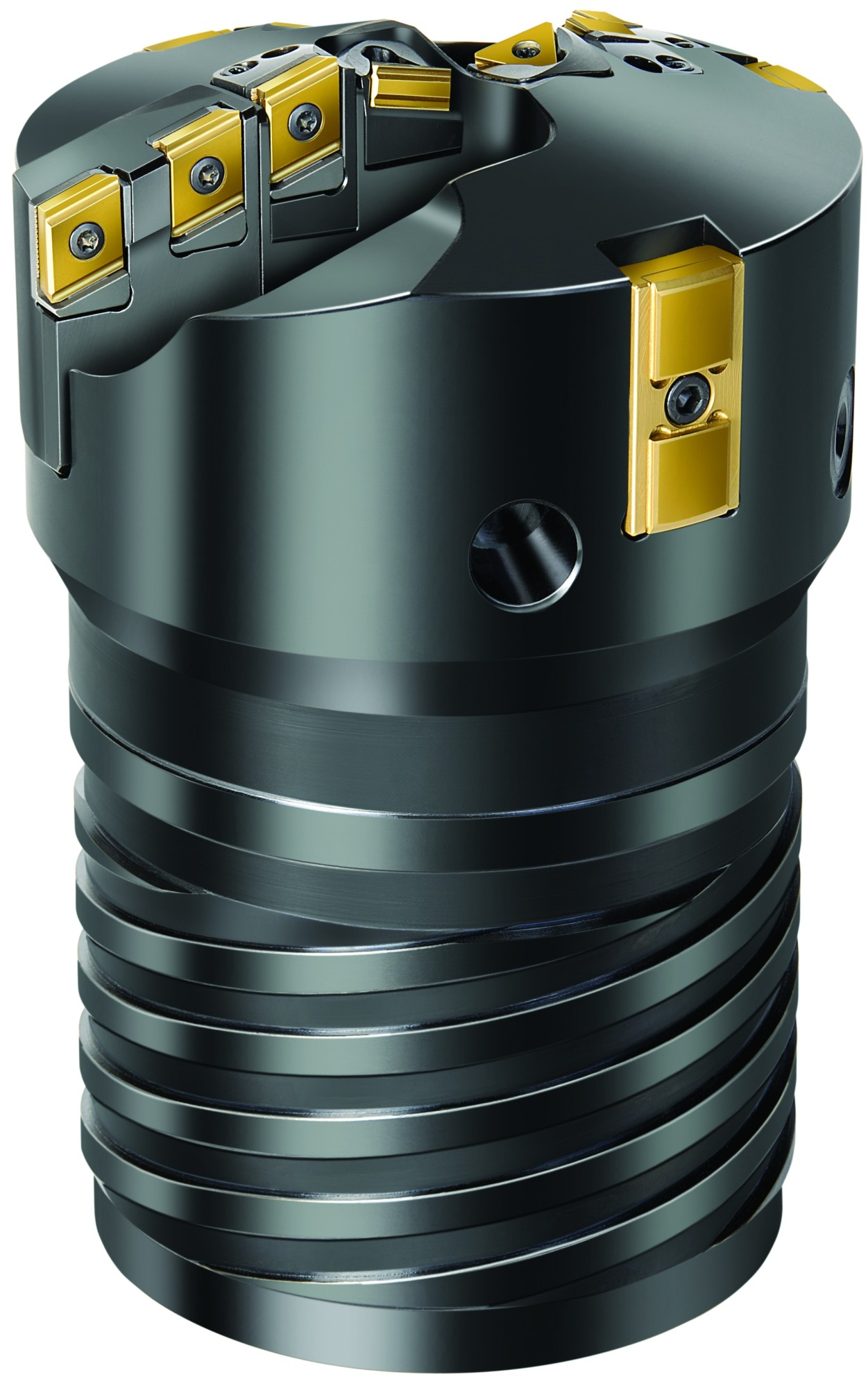
BTA deep hole drilling tool for drilling with split cutting edge from botek

The chips are removed through the openings integrated in the drilling head with the aid of the cutting oil flow. Therefore, the openings are called "chip mouth". In this way, the chips can be removed without contact to the bore hole wall. Due to the circular cross section of the tool and the drill tube, the process has a higher torsional resistance moment compared to single-lip deep hole drilling, which allows a significantly higher cutting performance to be achieved. The BTA process is used for bore hole diameters of D = 6...2000 mm. For industrial processes it is used in a range from approx. D = 16 mm. It is possible to manufacture BTA drill heads with a diameter of D ≤ 6 mm, but there is no known application case until today.

=== Ejector deep hole drilling ===
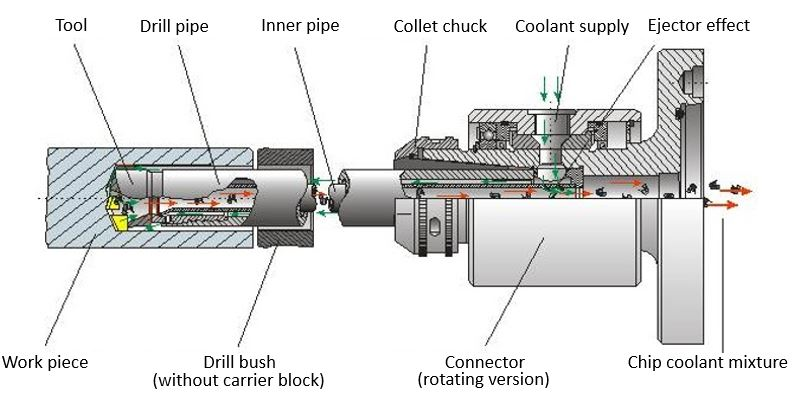
Process principle for ejector deep hole drilling

Ejector drilling head with soldered-on cutting edges and guide elements from Sandvik

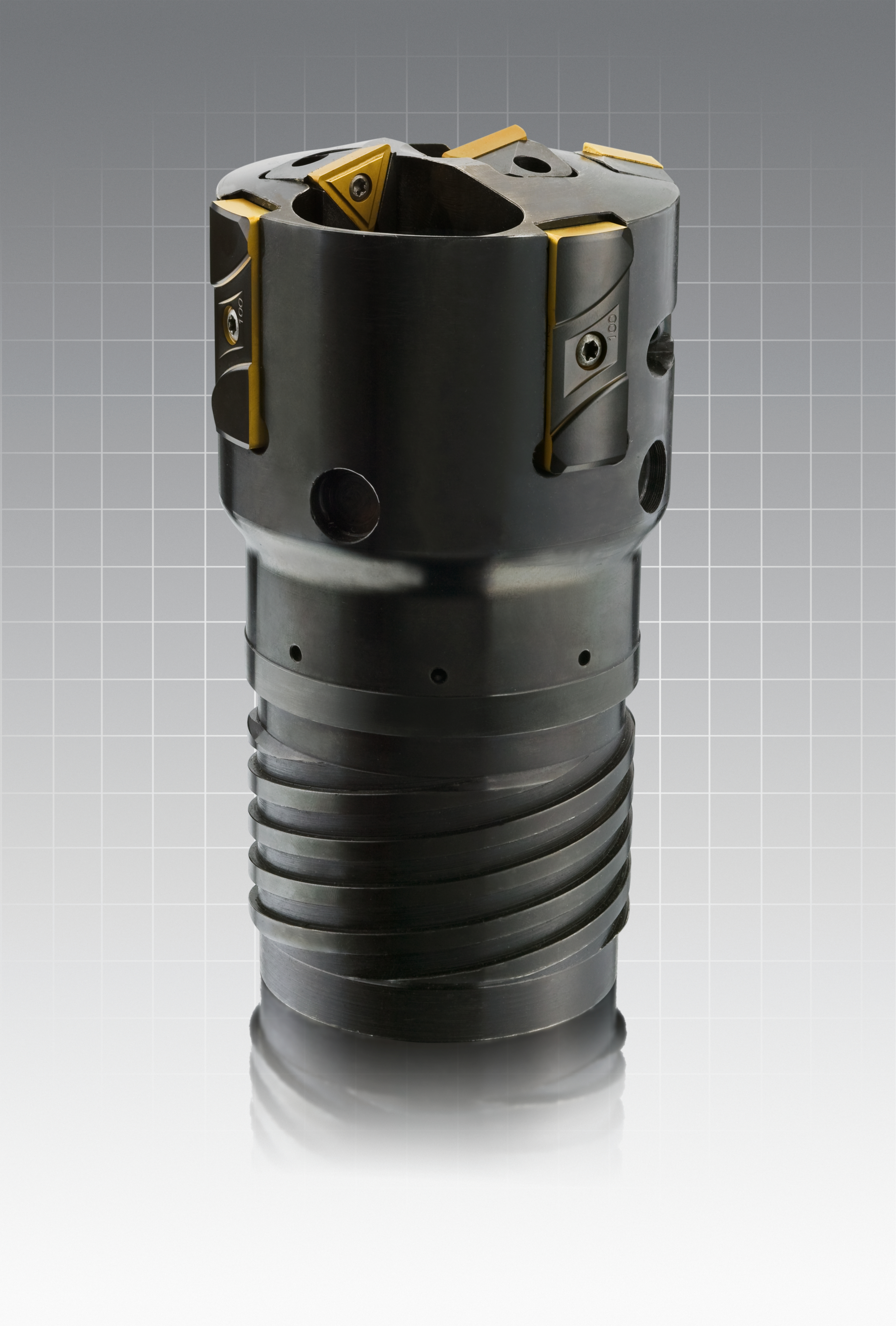
Ejector drilling head with replaceable cutting edges and guide elements from Sandvik

The ejector deep hole drilling is used in a diameter range of approx. D = 18 ... 250 mm. It is a variant of the BTA process in which the drill heads used are structurally comparable to the BTA tool system. The only difference are additional coolant outlets on the circumference of the tool. The coolant is supplied through the ring space between the drill tube and the inner tube, which also gives the process the name two-tube process. The coolant emerges laterally from the already mentioned coolant outlets, flows around the drill head and flows back into the inner tube transporting the produced chips. Part of the coolant is fed directly into the inner tube via a ring nozzle. This creates a negative pressure (ejector effect) at the chip mouth, which facilitates the backflow in the inner tube. The system can be operated via an external high-pressure pump or the internal coolant supply of the machine. Since, in contrast to the BTA process, no sealing against escaping coolant is required, the ejector process can also be used on conventional lathes and machining centres. As the pipe cross-section through which the chips are to be removed is reduced by the double tube system, the cutting capacity is lower than with the BTA process. For this reason, lower cutting speeds are usually selected for ejector deep hole drilling. In addition, the lower rigidity is accompanied by poorer concentricity properties (IT9 to IT11).

A prerequisite for the implementation of the process is the use of a connecting piece which is inserted into the turret holder of the lathe or the spindle of the machining centre. Through this connection piece, the coolant is fed from the connected pump unit into the ring gap between the inner and outer tube. To enable this function, two different versions are available. A rotating connection piece is required for machining centres, and a non-rotating connection piece for lathes. The required installation space must be taken into account when selecting the machine tool.

Tools

The design of the tools for ejector deep hole drilling is almost identical to that of the BTA deep hole drilling tools. The additional coolant discharge outlets are shown in the illustrations.

== Methods associated with deep hole drilling ==
In addition to the classical deep hole drilling methods, there are a number of other methods for the final processing of deep holes. The hole can be post-processed with regard to their surface finish or can serve as a basis for machining complex and non-cylindrical contours.

=== Internal profiling ===
For various reasons, there are components with deep holes whose inner contours are rotationally symmetrical but not uniformly cylindrical. Such components can have contours without undercuts, e.g. for centrifugal casting moulds or conical bores in extruder cylinders, and with undercuts, e.g. for propeller shafts or landing gears. To produce such chamber pockets, high quality pre-drilling is required. If the radially extendable cutting tool holder is controlled via an NC axis and connected to the NC bore slide of the deep hole drilling machine, it is almost possible to produce any bore hole wall contour in one cut over the entire contour length. The position of the cutting edge can be modified by an axial displacement, e.g. by using an internal thrust tube. In addition, the guide pads can also be adjusted hydraulically. Since the guide bore has already been machined after the first cutting step for the so-called long chamber method, the guide pads must also be radially adjustable to support the tool for larger chambers. As an alternative to this method, the so-called short-chamber method does not require extendable guide pads, as the tool is only seated in the pre-drilled guide hole.

=== Skiving and smooth rolling ===
Skiving improves the roundness and the dimensional accuracy of the bore hole diameter. The process creates an open surface profile, which is particularly suitable for subsequent machining processes such as smooth rolling or honing. In the field of machining hydraulic cylinders and cylinder liners, skiving and smooth rolling is considered a manufacturing process related to deep hole drilling, although it has a cutting and also a forming component. The reason for this is the wide use of combined skiving and smooth rolling tools.

=== Single edge reaming ===
Another machining process to increase the surface quality and dimensional accuracy of a bore hole is the use of single-bladed reamers. Reaming is the countersinking of a pre-drilled hole, where the tool is supported by the guide pads themselves. Therefore, the tool geometry of these reamers is very similar to single-lip drills. The difference to single-lip deep hole drilling with low cutting depth is the usually missing circumferential chamfer, a long side cutting edge parallel to the milling axis and the low coolant volumes and pressures.

== Deep hole drilling machines ==
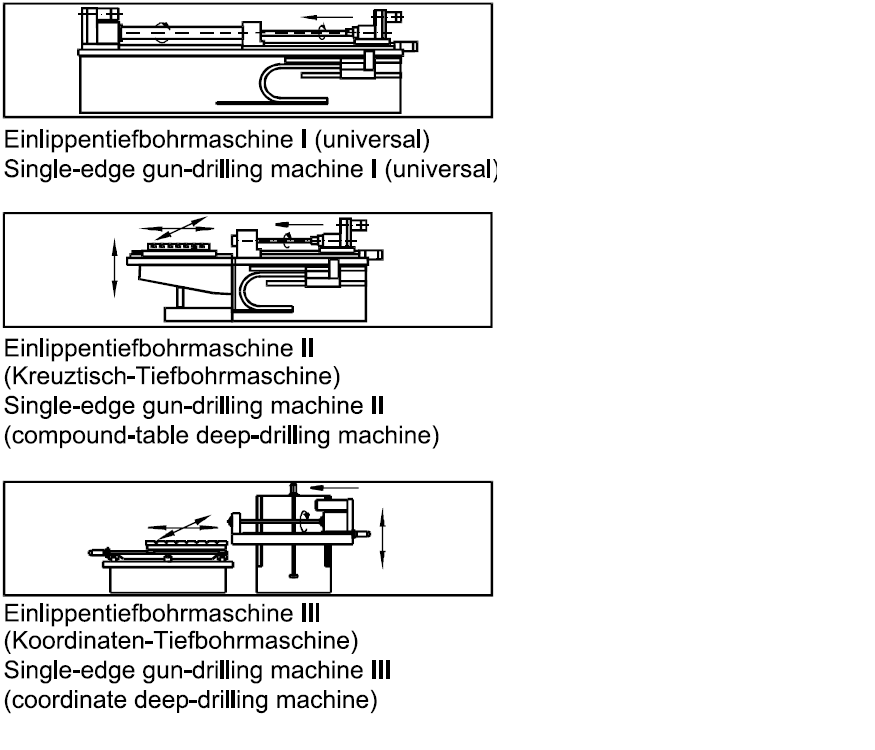
Designs of deep hole drilling machines (examples with indication of feed and cutting movement)

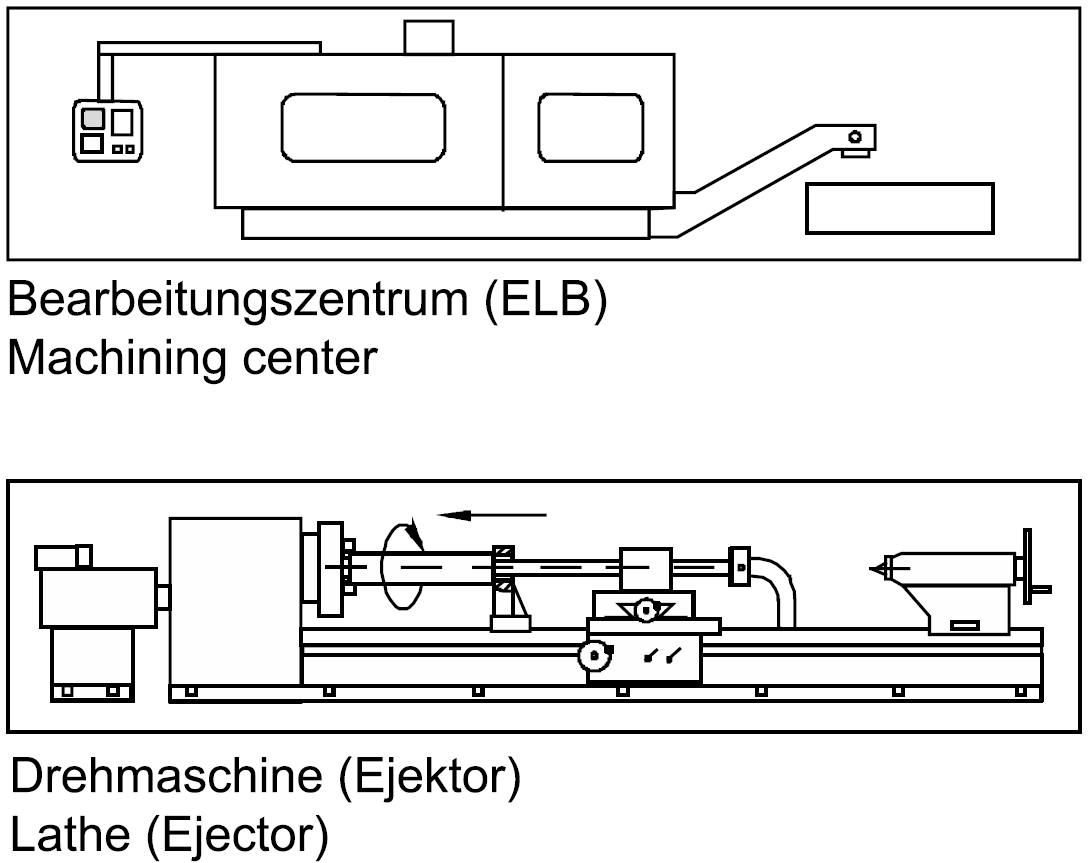
Machine tools on which deep hole drilling is performed (examples partly with indication of feed and cutting movement)

For machining with deep hole drilling processes or processes associated with deep hole drilling, deep hole drilling machines are mainly used as standard (multi-purpose) or special machines. Gun drills are an archetypal example. Often single-lip deep hole drills are used on machining centres for the production of holes with smaller drilling depths (up to approx. 40 × D). Ejector drilling is mainly used on conventional machine tools. Since deep hole drilling has a high productivity, only comparatively powerful machines are used. Basically, a coolant system is required that provides coolant with (compared to other drilling methods) above-average volume flow at higher pressures. A deep hole drilling system consists of the deep drilling machine and the coolant tank with further peripheral equipment for coolant preparation and chip handling. The ejector drilling process was developed as deep hole drilling technology which can be used on conventional machine tools. The use of single-lip deep hole drilling is particularly common on machining centres in series production. On the right you can see schematic drawings of conventional deep hole drilling machines.

== Literature ==
VDI – The Association of German Engineers guidelines

- VDI 3208: Tiefbohren mit Einlippenbohrern
- VDI 3209: Tiefbohren mit äußerer Zuführung des Kühlschmierstoffs (BTA- und ähnliche Verfahren)
- VDI 3209: Blatt 2 Tiefbohren; Richtwerte für das Schälen und Glattwalzen von Bohrungen
- VDI 3210: Blatt 1 Tiefbohrverfahren
- VDI 3211: Tiefbohren auf Bearbeitungszentren
- VDI 3212: Abnahmebedingungen für einspindelige und mehrspindelige Tiefbohrmaschinen
