= Machinability =

Ease with which a metal can be cut

Machinability is the ease with which a metal can be cut (machined) permitting the removal of the material with a satisfactory finish at low cost. Materials with good machinability (free-machining materials) require little power to cut, can be cut quickly, easily obtain a good finish, and do not cause significant wear on the tooling. Factors that typically improve a material's performance often degrade its machinability, presenting a significant engineering challenge.

Machinability can be difficult to predict due to the large number of variables involved in the machining process. Two sets of factors are the condition and physical properties of the work materials. The condition of the work material includes at least eight factors: microstructure, grain size, heat treatment, chemical composition, fabrication, hardness, yield strength, and tensile strength. Physical properties are those of the individual material groups, such as the modulus of elasticity, thermal conductivity, thermal expansion, and work hardening. Other important factors are operating conditions, cutting tool material and geometry, and the parameters of the specific machining process being performed.

== Machinability of steels ==
Steels are among the most important and commonly used materials in engineering. Free-machining steels are alloys that include elements like sulfur and lead that reduce the size of chips produced by the machining process. Free-machining steels are more expensive than standard steels, but their cost is offset by savings on manufacturing costs.

== Quantifying machinability ==
There are many factors affecting machinability, but no widely accepted way to quantify it. Instead, machinability is often assessed on a case-by-case basis, and tests are tailored to the needs of a specific manufacturing process. Common metrics for comparison include tool life, surface finish quality, cutting temperature, tool forces, and power consumption.

=== Tool life method ===
Machinability can be based on the measure of how long a tool lasts. This can be useful when comparing materials that have similar properties and power consumptions, but one is more abrasive and thus decreases the tool life. The major downfall with this approach is that tool life is dependent on more than just the material it is machining; other factors include cutting tool material, cutting tool geometry, machine condition, cutting tool clamping, cutting speed, feed, and depth of cut. Also, the machinability for one tool type cannot be compared to another tool type (i.e. HSS tool to a carbide tool).

$\text{Machinability index (}\%{)} = \frac{\text{cutting speed of material for 20 minute tool life}}{\text{cutting speed of free-cutting steel for 20 minute tool life}} \times 100$

=== Tool forces and power consumption method ===
The forces required for a tool to cut through a material is directly related to the power consumed. Therefore, tool forces are often given in units of specific energy. This leads to a rating method where higher specific energies equal lower machinability. The advantage of this method is that outside factors have little effect on the rating.

=== Surface finish method ===
The surface finish is sometimes used to measure the machinability of a material. Soft, ductile materials tend to form a built-up edge. Stainless steel and other materials with a high strain hardening ability also want to form a built up edge. Aluminium alloys, cold worked steels, and free-machining steels, as well as materials with a high shear zone, do not tend to form built-up edges, so these materials would rank as more machinable.

The advantage of this method is that it is easily measured with the appropriate equipment. The disadvantage of this criterion is that it is often irrelevant. For instance, when making a rough cut, the surface finish is of no importance. Also, finish cuts often require a certain accuracy that naturally achieves a good surface finish. This rating method also does not always agree with other methods. For instance, titanium alloys would rate well by the surface finish method, low by the tool life method, and intermediate by the power consumption method.

=== Machinability rating ===
The machinability rating of a material attempts to quantify the machinability of various materials. It is expressed as a percentage or a normalized value. The American Iron and Steel Institute (AISI) determined machinability ratings for a wide variety of materials by running turning tests at 180 surface feet per minute (sfpm). It then arbitrarily assigned 160 Brinell B1112 steel a machinability rating of 100%. The machinability rating is determined by measuring the weighted averages of the normal cutting speed, surface finish, and tool life for each material. Note that a material with a machinability rating less than 100% would be more difficult to machine than B1112, and material with a value more than 100% would be easier.

Machinability Rating= (Speed of Machining the workpiece giving 60min tool life)/( Speed of machining the standard metal)

$\text{Machinability rating (}\%{)} = \frac{\text{Speed of Machining the workpiece for 60 minute tool life}}{\text{Speed of machining the standard metal}}$

Machinability ratings can be used in conjunction with the Taylor tool life equation, $VT^n = C$, in order to determine cutting speeds or tool life. It is known that B1112 has a tool life of 60 minutes at a cutting speed of 100 sfpm. If a material has a machinability rating of 70%, then it can be determined, with the above knowns, that in order to maintain the same tool life (60 minutes), the cutting speed must be 70 sfpm (assuming the same tooling is used).

== Steels ==
The carbon content of steel greatly affects its machinability. High-carbon steels are difficult to machine because they are strong and because they may contain carbides that abrade the cutting tool. On the other end of the spectrum, low-carbon steels are troublesome because they are too soft—they are "gummy" and stick to the cutting tool, resulting in a built-up edge that shortens tool life. Therefore, steel has the best machinability with medium amounts of carbon, about 0.20%.

Chromium, molybdenum, and other alloying metals are often added to steel to improve its strength. However, most of these metals also decrease machinability.

Inclusions in steel, especially oxides, may abrade the cutting tool. Machinable steel should be free of these oxides.

The machinability of alloyed rotor steels is also influenced by lubrication conditions and by structural-phase modifications of the material. Experimental studies on 38KhN3MFA steel have shown that cutting fluids can significantly affect chip morphology, surface deformation mechanisms and the formation of cutting products, while technological modification of the steel alters its microstructural response under variable machining regimes.

=== Additives ===
There are a variety of chemicals, both metal and non-metal, that can be added to steel to make it easier to cut. These additives may work by lubricating the tool-chip interface, decreasing the shear strength of the material, or increasing the brittleness of the chip. Historically, sulfur and lead have been the most common additives, but bismuth and tin are increasingly popular for environmental reasons.

Lead can improve the machinability of steel because it acts as an internal lubricant in the cutting zone. Since lead has poor shear strength, it allows the chip to slide more freely past the cutting edge. When it is added in small quantities to steel, it can greatly improve its machinability while not significantly affecting the steel's strength.

Sulfur improves the machinability of steel by forming low-shear-strength inclusions in the cutting zone. These inclusions are stress risers that weaken the steel, allowing it to deform more easily.

=== Stainless steel ===
Stainless steels have poor machinability compared to regular carbon steel because they are tougher, gummier, and tend to work harden very rapidly. Slightly hardening the steel may decrease its gumminess and make it easier to cut. AISI grades 303 and 416 are easier to machine because of the addition of sulfur and phosphorus.

== Aluminium ==
Aluminium is a much softer metal than steel, and the techniques to improve its machinability usually rely on making it more brittle. Alloys 2007, 2011, and 6020 have very good machinability.

== Other materials ==
Thermoplastics are difficult to machine because they have poor thermal conductivity. This creates heat that builds up in the cutting zone, which degrades the tool life and locally melts the plastic. Once the plastic melts, it just flows around the cutting edge instead of being removed by it. Machinability can be improved by using high-lubricity coolant and keeping the cutting area free of chip buildup.

Composites often have the worst machinability because they combine the poor thermal conductivity of a plastic resin with the tough or abrasive qualities of the fiber (glass, carbon, etc.) material.

The machinability of rubber and other soft materials improves by using a very-low-temperature coolant, such as liquid carbon dioxide. The low temperatures chill the material prior to cutting so that it cannot deform or stick to the cutting edge. This means less wear on the tools and easier machining.

== See also ==
- Machining vibrations
