= Chipbreaker =

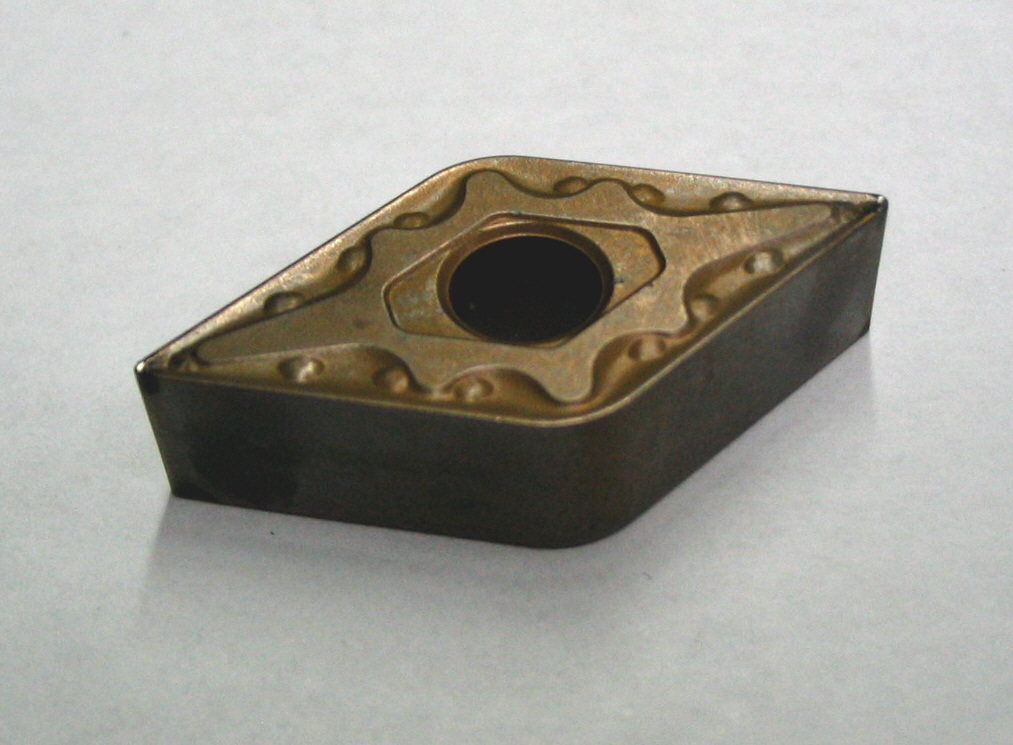
On indexable inserts, the chipbreaker is clearly visible as a contour directly behind the cutting edge

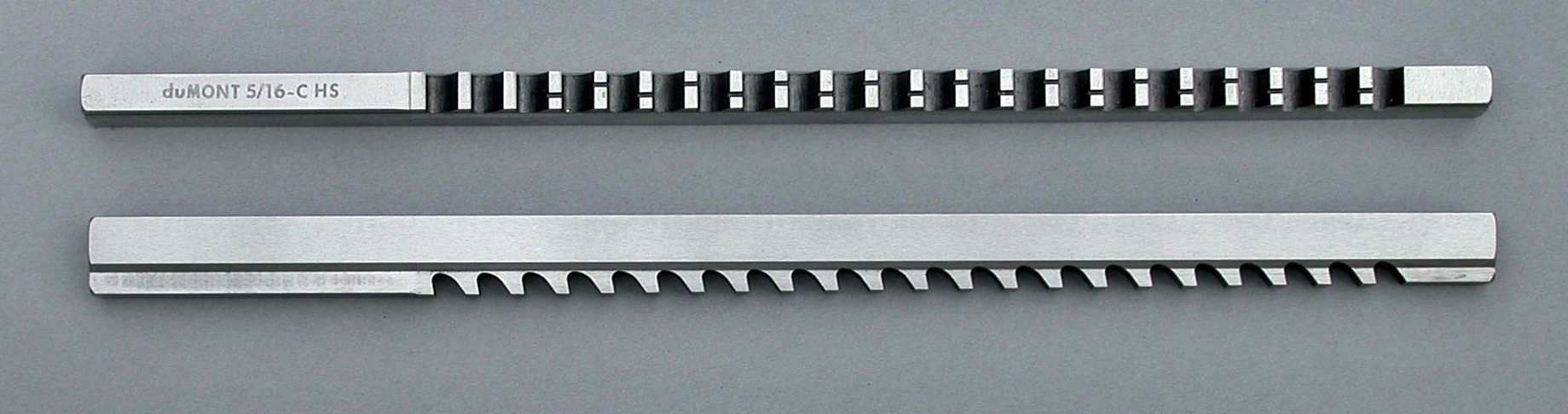
Offset grooves on a broach acts as chipbreakers

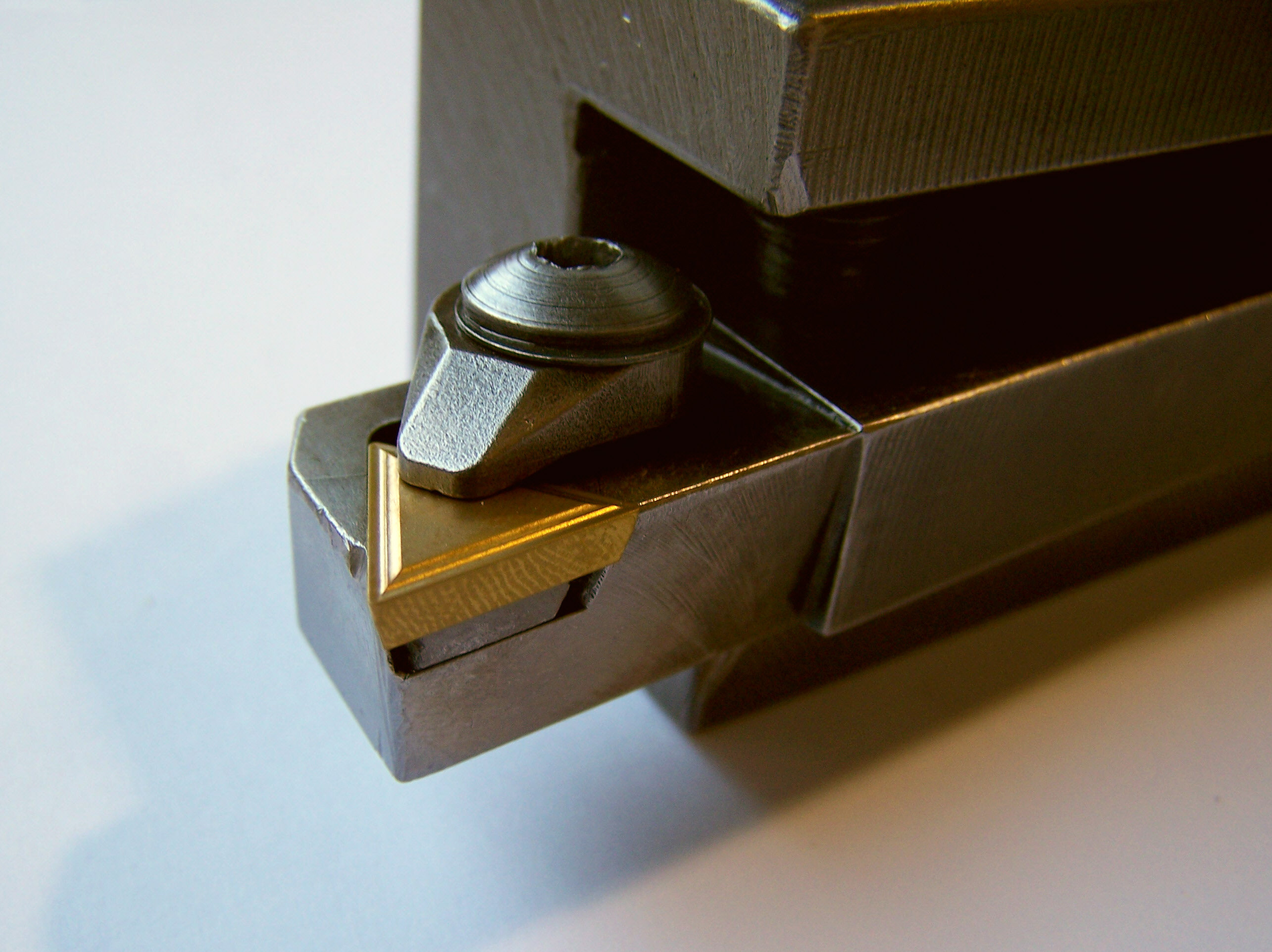
Chipbreaker on a turning tool

A chipbreaker or chip breaker is a contour just behind the cutting part of a cutting tool that directs away any chips that are generated. Metal chips are hot, sharp, and can spin at high speeds, especially if they get caught in machinery. Breaking up the chips into smaller pieces is an important safety feature since long chips that get caught in people and machinery can lead to serious workplace accidents. It can also damage tools, workpieces and machinery, and make removal of the finished product more difficult.

Chips can be particularly challenging with ductile materials. Many geometries can be used depending on the given cutting conditions. For example, a high-positive rake angle will help to make shorter chips.

On many ceramic cutting tools, the chipbreaker is sandwiched between the cutting plate and the clamping jaw, as this eliminates the need for a wide variety of special cutting plates.

On roughing cutters or milled files, the cutting edge is given a profile with chipbreakers to break the chips. On handplaners, there is usually also a chipbreaker to reduce tear-out.
