= Rake angle =

Angle between a cutting tool face and the workpiece

A schematic showing positive (left) and negative (right) rake angles.

In machining, the rake angle is a parameter used in various cutting processes, describing the angle of the cutting face relative to the workpiece. There are three types of rake angles: positive, zero or neutral, and negative.

- Positive rake: A tool has a positive rake when the face of the cutting tool slopes away from the cutting edge at the inner side.
- Zero rake: A tool has a zero (or neutral) rake when the face of the cutting tool is perpendicular to the cutting edge at the inner side.
- Negative rake: A tool has a negative rake angle when the face of the cutting tool slopes away from the cutting edge at the outer side.

Positive rake angles generally:

- Make the tool more sharp and pointed. This reduces the strength of the tool, as the small included angle in the tip may cause it to chip away.
- Reduce cutting forces and power requirements.
- Helps in the formation of continuous chips in ductile materials.
- Can help avoid the formation of a built-up edge.

Negative rake angles generally:

- Increase the strength of the cutting edge. The tool is more blunt.
- Increases the cutting force.
- Increases the power required for a cut.
- Can increase friction, resulting in higher temperatures.
- Can improve surface finish.

Zero rake angles:

- Easier to manufacture.
- Easier to resharpen.
- Less power and cutting forces than a negative raked tool.
- Chip will wear and 'crater' the rake face.

== Recommended rake angles ==
Recommended rake angles can vary depending on the material being cut, tool material, depth of cut, cutting speed, machine, setup and process. This table summarizes recommended rake angles for: single-point turning on a lathe, drilling, milling, and sawing.

Material being cut	Turning Rake	Drilling Rake	Milling Rake	Sawing Rake
Aluminum	12°-25°	40°	35°	12°-25°
Brass	3°-14°	8°	0°	3°-14°
Bronze	5°-14°		0°	5°-14°
Cast Iron, Gray	0°-6°	0°	5°	3°-6°
Copper	18°-25°		16°	18°-25°
Polystyrene	20°-25°			20°-25°
PVC	20°-25°			20°-25°
Stainless Steel	8°-10°	8°	8°	8°-10°
Steel, Mild	12°-14°	20°	8°-15°	12°-14°
Titanium	0°-4°			0°-4°
