= Cutting force (machining) =

Cutting force in machining is the physical resistance offered by a workpiece material to being penetrated and deformed by a cutting tool to form a chip.

In machining, estimating the required cutting forces is essential to ensure proper process planning. An adequate estimation allows for the correct selection of cutting tools and necessary fixtures to avoid dimensional and geometric accuracy issues due to deflections, vibrations, etc. At the same time, estimating cutting forces enables the calculation of the required cutting power, allowing for the correct selection of the machine tool (lathe, milling machine, etc.).

Taking the turning process as an example of a machining operation, Figure 1 shows the forces that appear during the cutting process. The principal cutting force ($F_t$) defines the resultant force in the direction of the cutting motion. The normal component or thrust force ($N_t$) is the force perpendicular to the cutting edge and the principal cutting force. Generally, this force accounts for 50% to 70% of the cutting force. Depending on the tool's lead angle (principal position angle), this force results in an axial component ($N_{ta}$) and a radial component ($N_{tr}$). Depending on the specific machining operation, these components result in the feed forces. For example, in a straight turning operation where the tool moves in a longitudinal direction (parallel to the workpiece axis), the axial normal component is equivalent to the feed force required for the operation.

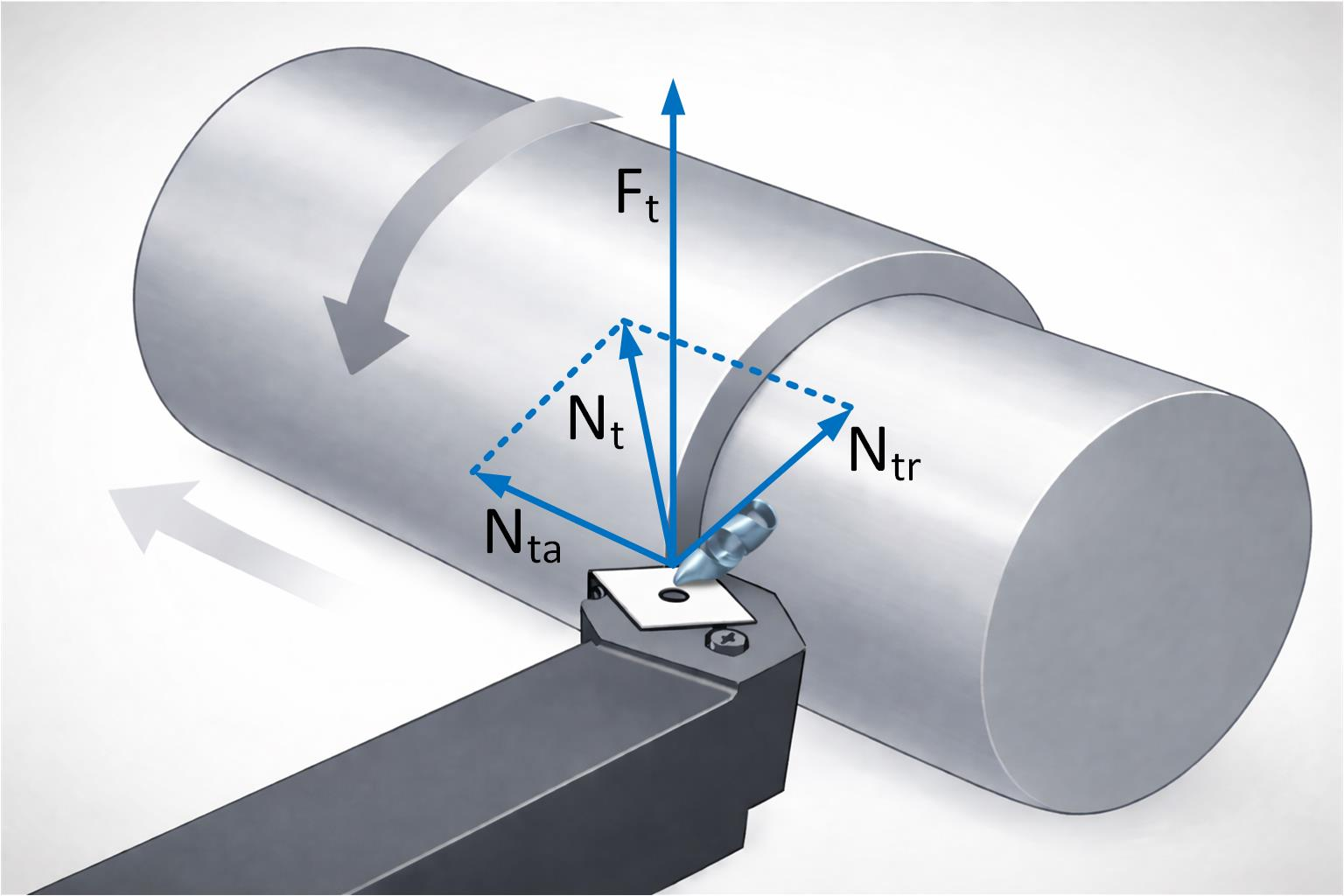
Figure 1. Cutting force and thrust force (axial and radial component) in a straight turning operation

== Cutting force calculation ==
Although various methods exist for estimating cutting forces in machining (see technical textbooks,), the most commonly used approach is the specific cutting pressure method. Most cutting tool manufacturers (e.g., Sandvik Coromant, Mitsubishi Materials) provide data related to specific pressure to facilitate the estimation of forces and power in machining operations.

This calculation method establishes that the cutting force is directly proportional to the undeformed chip cross-section, using a proportionality constant known as specific cutting pressure or specific cutting resistance. This proportionality constant is expressed as:

$$F_t = k_c \cdot A_c$$

where $F_t$ is the cutting force and $A_c$ is the undeformed chip cross-section.

The cutting pressure depends on several factors, such as:

1. Workpiece material: A material with higher mechanical strength has a higher $k_c$.
2. Cutting tool material: Together with the workpiece material, these define the friction coefficient between the chip and the tool's rake face. Cutting tools with a lower friction coefficient during cutting result in a lower $k_c$.
3. Cutting tool geometry: The rake angle of the cutting tool influences the deformation work experienced by the chip. Larger rake angles result in lower $k_c$ values.
4. Chip cross-section: Experimental tests show that $k_c$ is a function of the chip cross-section area, with $k_c$ decreasing as the area increases. For the same chip width, increasing the chip thickness causes $k_c$ to decrease.
5. Cutting speed: $k_c$ tends to slightly decrease as cutting speed increases, although it remains constant at high speeds.
6. Lubrication and cooling conditions: Better lubrication between the chip and the cutting tool reduces the friction coefficient, thereby decreasing $k_c$.
7. Tool wear: Increased wear modifies the cutting tool geometry and increases friction, leading to an increase in the specific cutting pressure $k_c$.

To calculate cutting forces using specific cutting pressure, tables are used that record the variations of $k_c$ based on variables dependent on the aforementioned factors. Thus, $k_c$ is typically obtained as:

$$k_c = k_{c1} \cdot f_e \cdot f_{\gamma}$$

The value $k_{c1}$ represents the specific cutting pressure for a specific material under fixed cutting conditions (using a reference tool with a specific rake angle and machining a specific chip thickness). The values $f_e$ and $f_{\gamma}$ are correction factors for chip thickness and rake angle, respectively, used to adjust the $k_{c1}$ value according to actual cutting conditions. The $k_{c1}$ values are tabulated based on tool material, workpiece material, etc. Specifically, for the $f_{\gamma}$ factor, the correction is estimated as:

$$f_{\gamma} = 1 + 0.01 \cdot (\gamma_0 - \gamma)$$

where $\gamma_0$ is the rake angle of the reference tool (usually 0°) and $\gamma$ is the rake angle of the tool used in machining. This shows that a tool with a smaller rake angle than the reference tool results in a correction factor greater than 1, indicating higher cutting forces. For the $f_e$ factor, it is sometimes estimated directly from tables or calculated as:

$$f_e = (t)^{-m_c}$$

where $t$ is the chip thickness of the analyzed operation and $m_c$ is a value found in tables that depends on the machined material and cutting conditions.

Regarding the calculation of cutting power, it is estimated as:

$$P_t = F_t \cdot V_c$$

where $F_t$ is the cutting force and $V_c$ is the cutting speed. The normal force components and the feed rate are generally not considered, as they represent a much lower power consumption compared to the cutting power—typically around only 1%.

== Specific cutting pressure ==
Different cutting tool manufacturers provide manuals and technical documentation with specific cutting pressure values. The following table shows some specific cutting pressure values collected from technical manuals by the manufacturer Sandvik Coromant, although similar values can be found from other cutting tool manufacturers.

Typical specific cutting pressure values
| Material | Observations | Specific cutting pressure ($k_{c1}$, $N/{mm^2}$) | $m_c$ |
|---|---|---|---|
| Unalloyed steel | Low carbon content (<0.55%) | 1,500 | 0.25 |
| Unalloyed steel | High carbon content (>0.55%) | 1,700 | 0.25 |
| Low-alloy steel | Not hardened | 1,700 | 0.25 |
| High-alloy steel | Tool steels | 2,900 | 0.25 |
| Stainless steel | - | 2,800 | 0.21 |
| Grey cast iron | - | 1,100 | 0.28 |
| Aluminum alloys | Al > 99% | 350 | 0.25 |
| Titanium alloys | Ti > 99% | 1,300 | 0.23 |

== Example. Cutting force calculation in turning ==
Consider a CNC lathe where turning (a straight turning operation) is performed on shafts of 30 mm diameter and 300 mm length made of low-carbon unalloyed steel, reducing their diameter to 26 mm. The shafts are machined between centers using a chuck and a carrier, with a carbide tool having a lead angle of 75° and a rake angle of 2°. A cutting speed of 180 m/min and a feed rate of 0.1 mm/rev are used. The schematic of the operation is shown in Figure 2.

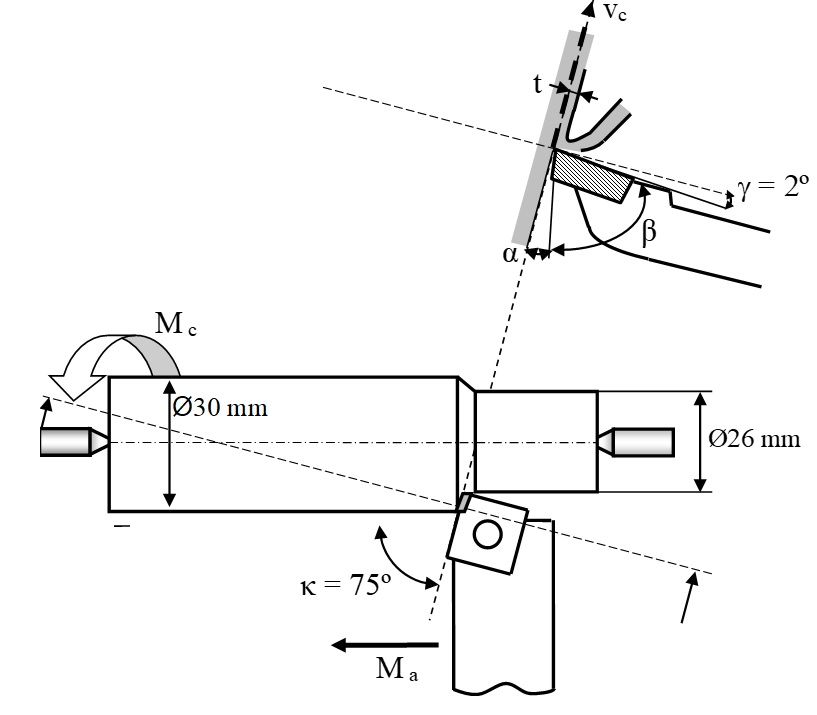
Figure 2. Schematic of turning with a workpiece mounted between centers

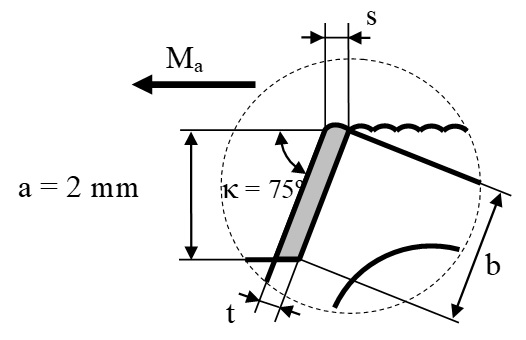
Figure 3. Chip cross-section in the turning operation

The cutting forces for the operation are estimated as follows. Based on the cutting conditions, the cutting force is estimated as:

$$F_t = k_c \cdot A_c$$

The operation is performed with a depth of cut of 2 mm (reducing from Ø30 to Ø26 mm); therefore, the chip cross-section area (Figure 3) is:

$$A_c = b \cdot t = s \cdot a = 2 \cdot 0.1 = 0.2 mm^2$$

where $b$ is the chip width, $t$ is the chip thickness, $s$ is the feed per revolution, and $a$ is the depth of cut. The specific cutting pressure is calculated as:

$$k_c = k_{c1} \cdot f_e \cdot f_{\gamma}$$

For unalloyed steel, according to the table, the values are $k_{c1}=1,500 N/mm^2$ and $m_c=0.25$.

Thus, the chip thickness correction factor is:

$$f_e = (t)^{-m_c} = (0.097)^{-0.25} = 1.794$$

Since the chip thickness is:

$$t = s \cdot \sin(\kappa) = 0.1 \cdot \sin(75^\circ) = 0.097 mm$$

Furthermore, the rake angle correction factor is:

$$f_{\gamma} = 1 + 0.01 \cdot (\gamma_0 - \gamma) = 1 + 0.01 \cdot (0 - 2) = 0.98$$

Given that $\gamma_{0}=0$ for the specific pressure table, then:

$$k_c = k_{c1} \cdot f_e \cdot f_{\gamma} = 1,500 \cdot 1.794 \cdot 0.98 = 2,637 N/mm^2$$

And the cutting force is:

$$F_t = k_c \cdot A_c = 2,637 \cdot 0.2 = 527.4 N$$

== See also ==
- Metalworking
- Cutting tool
- Turning
- Lathe
