= Free-machining steel =

Steel that forms small chips when machined

Free-machining steel is steel that forms small chips when machined. This increases the material's machinability by breaking the chips into small pieces, thus avoiding entanglement in the machinery. This enables automatic equipment to run without human interaction. Free-machining steel with lead also allows for higher machining rates. Free-machining steel costs 15 to 20% more than standard steel, but increased machining speeds, larger cuts, and longer tool life offset the higher cost.

The disadvantages of free-machining steel are: ductility is decreased, impact resistance is reduced, copper-based brazed joints suffer from embrittlement with bismuth free-machining grades, and shrink fits are not as strong.

== Types ==
There are four main types of free-machining steel: leaded, resulfurized, rephosphorized, and super. Super-free-machining steels are alloyed with tellurium, selenium, and bismuth.

SAE steel grades for free-machining steel
| Type | SAE designation |
|---|---|
| Leaded | 12L13 |
| Leaded | 12L14 |
| Rephosphorized and resulfurized | 1211 |
| Rephosphorized and resulfurized | 1212 |
| Rephosphorized and resulfurized | 1213 |
| Resulfurized | 1117 |
| Resulfurized | 1118 |
| Resulfurized | 1119 |

== Mechanics ==
Free-machining steels are carbon steels with added sulfur, lead, bismuth, selenium, tellurium, or phosphorus. Sulfur forms the compound manganese sulfide, which is soft and acts as a chip-breaking discontinuity. It also acts as a dry lubricant to prevent a built-up edge on the cutting tool. Lead works in a similar way to sulfur. Bismuth achieves a free-machining steel by melting into a thin film of liquid for a fraction of a microsecond to lubricate the cut. Other advantages to bismuth include being more uniformly distributed because of its density, which is similar to iron, being more environmentally friendly than lead, and being weldable.
