= Built-up edge =

Material accumulated against a cutting tool tip

Schematic diagram showing a built up edge.

In machining, specifically cutting operations, a built-up edge (BUE) is an accumulation of material against the rake face that seizes the tool tip, separating it from the chip.

== Formation ==
Because shear is strongest at the initial contact surface with the cutting tool, the first layer of metal impacting and seizing on it work-hardens more than the rest of the volume of metal. As a consequence of this work hardening, this first layer of metal is stronger than the adjacent metal moving away from the workpiece. Effectively, said first layer becomes part of the tool. The process repeats itself and, after some time, a built-up edge (which could be several hundred micrometres thick) forms.

The conditions necessary for a noticeable edge to build up are that:

- The cutting speed is low. This is because, at high cutting speeds, the metal moving away from the workpiece becomes hot enough to recover before seizing onto the tool, preventing the formation of a BUE.
- The metal being cut is one that work-hardens and is reluctant to recover. A BUE will not form with pure metals since they do not work-harden much. Conversely, alloys, such as steel, do work-harden and recover less, so they are prone to forming a BUE.

== Effects on the cutting process ==
The built-up edge effectively changes tool geometry and rake steepness. It also reduces the contact area between the chip and the cutting tool, leading to:

- A reduction in the power demand of the cutting operation.
- A slight increase in tool life, since the cutting is partly being done by the built up edge rather than the tool itself.

However, the formation of BUEs have negative effects on the quality of the workpiece, specifically:

- Excessive work hardening at the surface of the workpiece.
- Poor surface finish, since bits of the BUE eventually break off and stick to the workpiece. These bits tend to be problematic since, due to the work-hardening they underwent, they are very hard and so become abrasive.
- A reduction in the dimensional control of the process, due to the dynamically changing geometry of the cutting tool.

== See also ==
- Metalworking – Process of making items from metal
- Machinability – Ease with which a metal can be cut
