= Cemented carbide =

Type of composite material

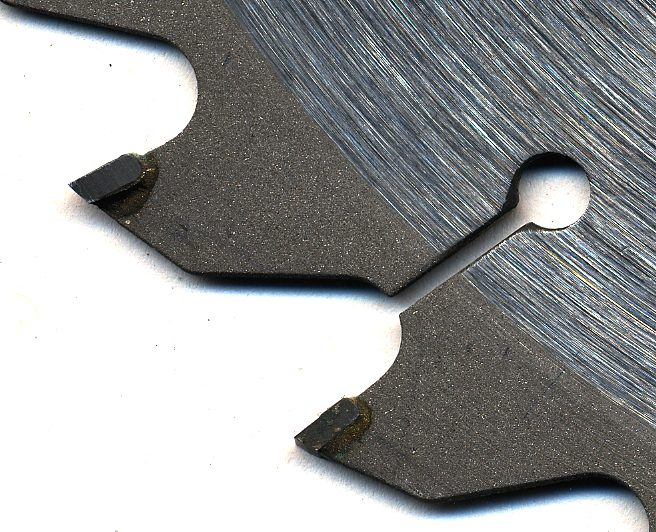
Circular saw blade with tungsten-carbide inserts

Cemented carbides are a class of hard materials used extensively for cutting tools, as well as in other industrial applications. It consists of fine particles of carbide cemented into a composite by a binder metal. Cemented carbides commonly use tungsten carbide (WC), titanium carbide (TiC), or tantalum carbide (TaC) as the aggregate. Mentions of "carbide" or "tungsten carbide" in industrial contexts usually refer to these cemented composites.

Most of the time, carbide cutters will leave a better surface finish on a part and allow for faster machining than high-speed steel or other tool steels. Carbide tools can withstand higher temperatures at the cutter-workpiece interface than standard high-speed steel tools (which is a principal reason enabling the faster machining). Carbide is usually superior for the cutting of tough materials such as carbon steel or stainless steel, as well as in situations where other cutting tools would wear away faster, such as high-quantity production runs. In situations where carbide tooling is not required, high-speed steel is preferred for its lower cost.

== Construction ==
Cemented carbides are metal matrix composites where carbide particles act as the aggregate and a metallic binder serves as the matrix (analogous to concrete, where a gravel aggregate is suspended in a cement matrix). The structure of cemented carbide is conceptually similar to that of a grinding wheel, but the abrasive particles are much smaller; macroscopically, the material of a carbide cutter appears homogeneous.

The process of combining the carbide particles with the binder is referred to as sintering or hot isostatic pressing (HIP). During this process, the material is heated until the binder enters a liquid phase while the carbide grains (which have a much higher melting point) remain solid. At this elevated temperature and pressure, the carbide grains rearrange themselves and compact together, forming a porous matrix. The ductility of the metal binder serves to offset the brittleness of the carbide ceramic, resulting in the composite's high overall toughness and durability. By controlling various parameters, including grain size, cobalt content, dotation (e.g., alloy carbides) and carbon content, a carbide manufacturer can tailor the carbide's performance to specific applications.

The first cemented carbide developed was tungsten carbide (introduced in 1927) which uses tungsten carbide particles held together by a cobalt metal binder. Since then, other cemented carbides have been developed, such as titanium carbide, which is better suited for cutting steel, and tantalum carbide, which is tougher than tungsten carbide.

== Physical properties ==
The coefficient of thermal expansion of cemented tungsten carbide is found to vary with the amount of cobalt used as a metal binder. For 5.9% cobalt samples, a coefficient of 4.4 μm/(m·K) was measured, whereas 13% cobalt samples have a coefficient of around 5.0 μm/(m·K). Both values are only valid from 20 °C (68 °F) to 60 °C (140 °F) due to non-linearity in the thermal expansion process.

== Applications ==
=== Inserts for metal cutting ===
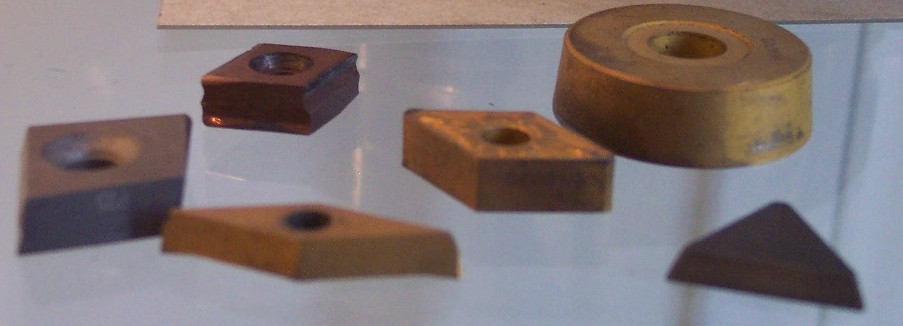
Tungsten-carbide inserts

Carbide is more expensive per unit than other typical tool materials, and it is more brittle, making it susceptible to chipping and breaking. To offset these problems, the carbide cutting tip itself is often in the form of a small insert for a larger tipped tool whose shank is made of another material, usually carbon tool steel. This gives the benefit of using carbide at the cutting interface without the high cost and brittleness of making the entire tool out of carbide. Most modern face mills use carbide inserts, as well as many lathe tools and endmills. In recent decades, though, solid-carbide endmills have also become more commonly used, wherever the application's characteristics make the pros (such as shorter cycle times) outweigh the cons (mentioned above). As well, modern turning (lathe) tooling may use a carbide insert on a carbide tool such as a boring bar, which are more rigid than steel insert holders and therefor less prone to vibration, which is of particular importance with boring or threading bars that may need to reach into a part to a depth many times the tool diameter.

==== Insert coatings ====
To increase the life of carbide tools, they are sometimes coated. Five such coatings are TiN (titanium nitride), TiC (titanium carbide), Ti(C)N (titanium carbide-nitride), TiAlN (titanium aluminium nitride) and AlTiN (aluminium titanium nitride). (Newer coatings, known as DLC (diamond-like carbon) are beginning to surface, enabling the cutting power of diamond without the unwanted chemical reaction between real diamond and iron.) Most coatings generally increase a tool's hardness and/or lubricity. A coating allows the cutting edge of a tool to cleanly pass through the material without having the material gall (stick) to it. The coating also helps to decrease the temperature associated with the cutting process and increase the life of the tool. The coating is usually deposited via thermal chemical vapor deposition (CVD) and, for certain applications, with the mechanical physical vapor deposition (PVD) method. However, if the deposition is performed at too high temperature, an eta phase of a Co_{6}W_{6}C tertiary carbide forms at the interface between the carbide and the cobalt phase, which may lead to adhesion failure of the coating.

=== Inserts for mining tools ===
Mining and tunnelling cutting tools are most often fitted with cemented carbide tips, the so-called "button bits". Artificial diamond can replace the cemented carbide buttons only when conditions are ideal, but as rock drilling is a tough job cemented carbide button bits remain the most used type throughout the world.

=== Rolls for hot-roll and cold-roll applications ===
Since the mid-1960s, steel mills around the world have applied cemented carbide to the rolls of their rolling mills for both hot and cold rolling of tubes, bars, and flats.

=== Other industrial applications ===
This category contains a countless number of applications, but can be split into three main areas:

- Engineered components
- Wear parts
- Tools and tool blanks

Some key areas where cemented carbide components are used:

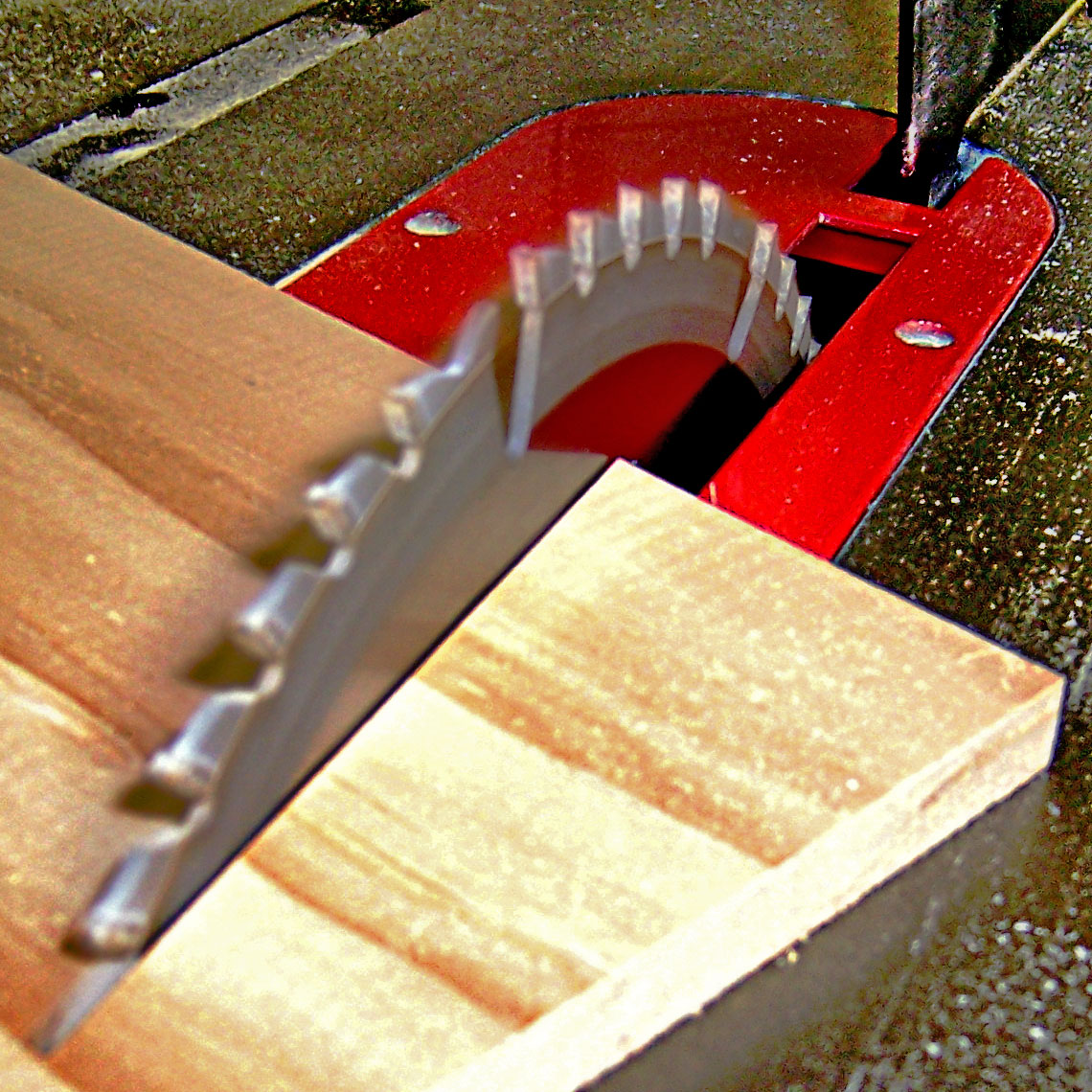
Spinning blade of a table saw cutting wood at an angle

- Automotive components
- Canning tools for deep drawing of two-piece cans.
- Rotary cutters for high-speed cutting of artificial fibres
- Metal forming tools for wire drawing and stamping applications, such as wire drawing dies.
- Rings and bushings typically for bump and seal applications
- Woodworking, e.g., for sawing and planing applications
- Pump pistons for high-performance pumps (e.g., in nuclear power installations)
- Nozzles, e.g., high-performance nozzles for oil drilling applications
- Roof and tail tools and components for high wear resistance
- Balls for ball bearings and ballpoint pens

=== Non-industrial uses ===
==== Jewellery ====
Tungsten carbide has become a popular material in the bridal jewellery industry, due to its extreme hardness and high resistance to scratching. Given its brittleness, it is prone to chip, crack, or shatter in jewellery applications. Once fractured, it cannot be repaired.

== History ==
The initial development of cemented and sintered carbides occurred in Germany in the 1920s. ThyssenKrupp says [in historical present tense], "Sintered tungsten carbide was developed by the 'Osram study society for electrical lighting' to replace diamonds as a material for machining metal. Not having the equipment to exploit this material on an industrial scale, Osram sells the license to Krupp at the end of 1925. In 1926 Krupp brings sintered carbide onto the market under the name WIDIA (acronym for WIe DIAmant = like diamond)." /ˈviːdiə/ Machinery's Handbook gives the date of carbide tools' commercial introduction as 1927. Burghardt and Axelrod give the date of their commercial introduction in the United States as 1928. Subsequent development occurred in various countries.

Although the marketing pitch was slightly hyperbolic (carbides being not entirely equal to diamond), carbide tooling offered an improvement in cutting speeds and feeds so remarkable that, like high-speed steel had done two decades earlier, it forced machine tool designers to rethink every aspect of existing designs, with an eye toward yet more rigidity and yet better spindle bearings.

During World War II there was a tungsten shortage in Germany. It was found that tungsten in carbide cuts metal more efficiently than tungsten in high-speed steel, so to economise on the use of tungsten, carbides were used for metal cutting as much as possible.

The Widia name became a genericized trademark in various countries and languages, including English (widia, /ˈwɪdiə/), although the genericized sense was never especially widespread in English ("carbide" is the normal generic term). Since 2009, the name has been revived as a brand name by Kennametal, and the brand subsumes numerous popular brands of cutting tools.

Uncoated tips brazed to their shanks were the first form. Clamped indexable inserts and a variety of coatings have been made in the decades since. Carbide cutting surfaces now come in a variety of configurations.

Regarding fine-grained hardmetal, an attempt has been made to follow the scientific and technological steps associated with its production; this task is not easy, though, because of the restrictions placed by commercial, and in some cases research, organisations, in not publicising relevant information until long after the date of the initial work. Thus, placing data in an historical, chronological order is somewhat difficult. However, it has been possible to establish that as far back as 1929, approximately 6 years after the first patent was granted, Krupp/Osram workers had identified the positive aspects of tungsten carbide grain refinement. By 1939, they had also discovered the beneficial effects of adding a small amount of vanadium and tantalum carbide. This effectively controlled discontinuous grain growth.

What was considered 'fine' in one decade was considered not so fine in the next. Thus, a grain size in the range 0.5–3.0 μm was considered fine in the early years, but by the 1990s, the era of the nano-crystalline material had arrived, with a grain size of 20–50 nm.

=== Pobedit ===
Pobedit (Russian: победи́т) is a sintered carbide alloy of about 90% tungsten carbide as a hard phase, and about 10% cobalt (Co) as a binder phase, with a small amount of additional carbon. Developed in the Soviet Union in 1929, it is described as a material from which cutting tools are made. Later a number of similar alloys based on tungsten and cobalt were developed, and the name of 'pobedit' was retained for them as well.

Pobedit is usually produced by powder metallurgy in the form of plates of different shapes and sizes. The manufacturing process is as follows: a fine powder of tungsten carbide (or other refractory carbide) and a fine powder of binder material such as cobalt or nickel both get intermixed and then pressed into the appropriate forms. Pressed plates are sintered at a temperature close to the melting point of the binder metal, which yields a very tight and solid substance.

The plates of this superhard composite are applied to manufacturing of metal-cutting and drilling tools; they are usually soldered on the cutting tool tips. Heat post-treatment is not required. The pobedit inserts at the tips of drill bits are still very widespread in Russia.

== See also ==
- Carbide saw
