= Cutting tool material =

Materials used in cutting tools

Cutting tool materials are materials that are used to make cutting tools which are used in machining (drill bits, tool bits, milling cutters, etc.) but not other cutting tools like knives or punches.

Cutting tool materials must be harder than the material of the workpiece, even at high temperatures during the process.

The following properties are required for cutting tool materials:

- hardness, hot hardness and pressure resistance
- bending strength and toughness
- inner bonding strength
- wear resistance
  - oxidation resistance
  - small propensity for diffusion and adhesion
  - abrasion resistance
  - edge strength

There is no material that shows all of these properties at the same time. Very hard materials, have lower toughness and break more easily. The following cutting tool materials are used:

- Tool steels: They are relatively cheap and tough. Their hardness is sufficient to machine other steels.
  - Carbon tool steels: They lose their hardness at 200 °C
  - High speed steels: They lose their hardness at 600 °C, and are widely used in machining. Due to their ability to retain hardness at higher temperature, higher cutting speeds are possible.
- Cemented carbides: Harder than tool steels, but less tough. Can be used up to 900 °C. There are many sort of cemented carbides like ones made of tungsten carbide and cobalt or cermets.
- Cutting ceramic: They are even harder than cemented carbides but have lower toughness. Aluminium oxide and silicon nitride are used. The latter has higher toughness, but can't be used for machining steel, due to very high wear. Alumina, or aluminum oxide, is also extensively used in the production of cutting tools due to its exceptional hardness and wear resistance. Alumina cutting tools also have high thermal conductivity, which helps dissipate heat generated during cutting, minimizing thermal damage to both the tool and the workpiece. Additionally, alumina's chemical stability ensures that it does not react with materials being cut, preventing contamination and maintaining the purity of the finished product.
- Super hard materials:
  - cubic boron nitride: It is nearly as hard as diamond.
  - diamond: The hardest known material, but can only be used up to 600 °C and can't be used to machine steel.
