= Behnam Malakooti =

Engineer

Behnam Malakooti is professor of systems engineering of department of electrical engineering and computer science at the Case Western Reserve University (CWRU), Ohio, US. He has been affiliated with CWRU since 1982. He is a pioneer researcher in risk, operations management, manufacturing systems, multiple criteria optimization. He developed artificial neural networks for predicting decision-making behavior for out-of-sample data. He also pioneered the theory of multiple-objective optimization for solving decision making, operations and manufacturing systems, machinability of materials, artificial neural networks, facility layout, and group technology and clustering.

== Education ==
- Ph.D. in industrial engineering (1982), Purdue University
- MS in industrial engineering (1979), Purdue University
- MS in economics (1978), Purdue University

== Honor and awards ==
Malakooti has received several awards, including

- Fellow, Institute of Industrial & Systems Engineers (IISE); one of twelve recipients, 1997.
- Fellow, Society of Manufacturing Engineers (SME), one of ten international recipients, 1996
- Fellow, Institute of Electrical and Electronics Engineers (IEEE), since 1998 .
- Divisional Professional Leadership Award, one of three national recipients, IEEE, 2000–2001 .
- Exceptional Research Achievement, department of electrical engineering and computer science, Case Western Reserve University, 2004 .

== Selected publications ==
- Malakooti, B, "Operations and production systems with multiple objectives" John Wiley & Sons, 2013
- Malakooti, B. "Decision Making Process: Typology, Intelligence, and Optimization" Journal of Intelligent Manufacturing , DOI: 10.1007/s10845-010-0424-1, Volume 23, Issue 3 (2012), Page 733-746.
- Brian J. Barritt, Shaya Sheikh, Camelia Al-Najjar- Behnam Malakooti, “Mobile Ad-Hoc Network Broadcasting: A Multi-Criteria Approach”, International Journal of Communication Systems, DOI: 10.1002/dac.1162,2010, Volume 24, Issue 4 (2011), Page 438-460.
- Malakooti, B., Y. Zhou, "An Adaptive Feedforward Artificial Neural Network with Application to Multiple Criteria Decision Making," Management Science, Vol. 40,11, Nov. 1994, pp. 1542–1561.
- Malakooti, B. "Ranking and Screening Multiple Criteria Alternatives with Partial Information and use of Ordinal and Cardinal Strength of Preferences", IEEE Transactions on Systems, Man, and Cybernetics - Part A, Vol. 30, 3, 355-369, 2000.
- Malakooti, B., "Multi-Objective Facility Layout: A Heuristic Method to Generate All Efficient Alternatives," International Journal of Production Research, Vol. 27, No. 7, 1989, pp. 1225–1238.
- Malakooti, B., J. Deviprasad, "An Interactive Multiple Criteria Approach for Parameter Selection in Metal Cutting," Operations Research, Vol. 37, No. 5, Sept.-Oct. 1989, pp. 805–8l8.
- Malakooti, B., A. Tsurushima, "An Expert System Using Priorities for Solving Multiple Criteria Facility Layout Problems," International Journal of Production Research Vol. 27, No. 5, 1989, pp. 793–808.
- Malakooti, Behnam, and Ying Q. Zhou. "Feedforward artificial neural networks for solving discrete multiple criteria decision making problems." Management Science 40.11 (1994): 1542-1561.
- Malakooti, B., and G. I. D'souza. "Multiple objective programming for the quadratic assignment problem." International Journal of Production Research 25.2 (1987): 285-300.
- Malakooti, Behnam. "A multiple criteria decision making approach for the assembly line balancing problem." International Journal of Production Research 29.10 (1991): 1979-2001.
- Malakooti, B. B. "Assembly line balancing with buffers by multiple criteria optimization." International Journal of Production Research 32.9 (1994): 2159-2178.
- Malakooti, B. (1989). Multiple objective facility layout: a heuristic to generate efficient alternatives. International Journal of Production Research, 27(7), 1225-1238.
- Malakooti, Behnam. "A decision support system and a heuristic interactive approach for solving discrete multiple criteria problems." IEEE Transactions on Systems, Man, and Cybernetics 18.2 (1988): 273-284.
- Malakooti, B., and Akira Tsurushima. "An expert system using priorities for solving multiple-criteria facility layout problems." International Journal of Production Research 27.5 (1989): 793-808.
