= Speeds and feeds =

Two separate velocities in machine tool practice, cutting speed and feed rate

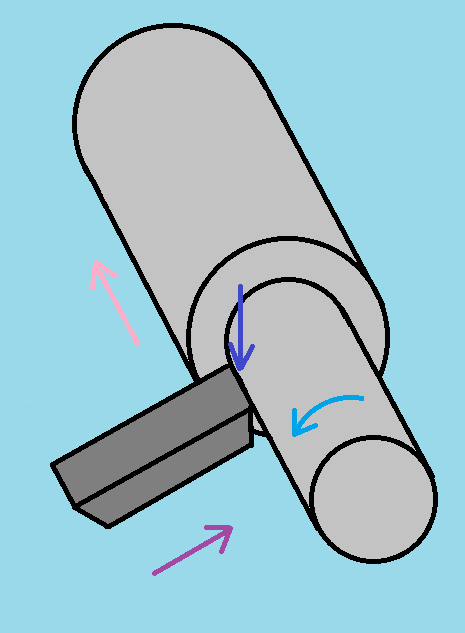
A line drawing showing some basic concepts of speeds and feeds in the context of lathe work. The angular velocity of the workpiece (rev/min) is called the "spindle speed" by machinists. Its tangential linear equivalent at the workpiece surface (m/min or sfm) is called the "cutting speed", "surface speed", or simply the "speed" by machinists. The "feeds" may be for the X-axis or the Z-axis (typically mm/rev or inch/rev for lathe work; sometimes measured as mm/min or inch/min). Notice that as the tool plunges closer to the workpiece's center, the same spindle speed will yield a decreasing surface (cutting) speed (because each rev represents a smaller circumferential distance, but takes the same amount of time). Most CNC lathes have constant surface speed to counteract that natural decrease, which speeds up the spindle as the tool plunges in.

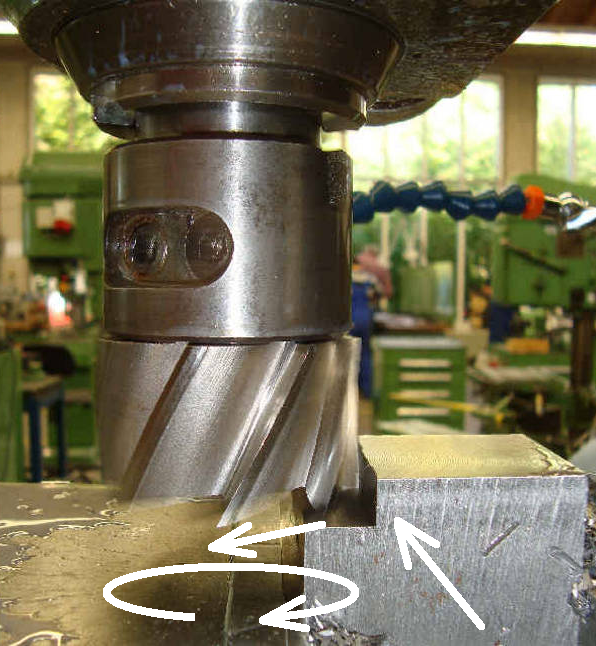
Photo of a milling cutter during a cutting operation. Arrows show the vectors of various velocities collectively known as speeds and feeds. The circular arrow represents the angular velocity of the spindle (rev/min), called the "spindle speed" by machinists. The tangential arrow represents the tangential linear velocity (m/min or sfm) at the outer diameter of the cutter, called the "cutting speed", "surface speed", or simply the "speed" by machinists. The arrow colinear with the slot that has been milled represents the linear velocity at which the cutter is advanced laterally (usually mm/min or inch/min for milling; may also be measured as mm/rev or inch/rev). This velocity is called the "feed" by machinists.

The phrase speeds and feeds or feeds and speeds refers to two separate parameters in machine tool practice, cutting speed and feed rate. They are often considered as a pair because of their combined effect on the cutting process. Each, however, can also be considered and analyzed in its own right.

Cutting speed (also called surface speed or simply speed) is the speed difference (relative velocity) between the cutting tool and the surface of the workpiece it is operating on. It is expressed in units of distance across the workpiece surface per unit of time, typically surface feet per minute (sfm) or meters per minute (m/min). Feed rate (or 'simply feed) is the relative velocity at which the cutter is advanced along the workpiece; its vector is perpendicular to the vector of cutting speed. Feed rate units depend on the motion of the tool and workpiece; when the workpiece rotates (e.g., in turning and boring), the units are almost always distance per spindle revolution (inches per revolution [in/rev or ipr] or millimeters per revolution [mm/rev]). When the workpiece does not rotate (e.g., in milling), the units are typically distance per time (inches per minute [in/min or ipm] or millimeters per minute [mm/min]), although distance per revolution or per cutter tooth are also sometimes used.

If variables such as cutter geometry and the rigidity of the machine tool and its tooling setup could be ideally maximized (and reduced to negligible constants), then only a lack of power (that is, kilowatts or horsepower) available to the spindle would prevent the use of the maximum possible speeds and feeds for any given workpiece material and cutter material. Of course, in reality those other variables are dynamic and not negligible, but there is still a correlation between power available and feeds and speeds employed. In practice, lack of rigidity is usually the limiting constraint.

Outside of the context of machine tooling, "speeds and feeds" can be used colloquially to refer to the technical details of a product or process.

== Cutting speed ==
Cutting speed may be defined as the rate at the workpiece surface, irrespective of the machining operation used. A cutting speed for mild steel of 100 ft/min is the same whether it is the speed of the cutter passing over the workpiece, such as in a turning operation, or the speed of the cutter moving past a workpiece, such as in a milling operation. The cutting conditions will affect the value of this surface speed for mild steel.

Schematically, speed at the workpiece surface can be thought of as the tangential speed at the tool-cutter interface, that is, how fast the material moves past the cutting edge of the tool, although "which surface to focus on" is a topic with several valid answers. In drilling and milling, the outside diameter of the tool is the widely agreed surface. In turning and boring, the surface can be defined on either side of the depth of cut, that is, either the starting surface or the ending surface, with neither definition being "wrong" as long as the people involved understand the difference. An experienced machinist summed this up succinctly as "the diameter I am turning from" versus "the diameter I am turning to." He uses the "from", not the "to", and explains why, while acknowledging that some others do not. The logic of focusing on the largest diameter involved (OD of drill or end mill, starting diameter of turned workpiece) is that this is where the highest tangential speed is, with the most heat generation, which is the main driver of tool wear.

There will be an optimum cutting speed for each material and set of machining conditions, and the spindle speed (RPM) can be calculated from this speed. Factors affecting the calculation of cutting speed are:

- The material being machined (steel, brass, tool steel, plastic, wood) (see table below)
- The material the cutter is made from (high-carbon steel, high-speed steel (HSS), carbide, ceramics, and diamond tools)
- The economical life of the cutter (the cost to regrind or purchase new, compared to the quantity of parts produced)

Cutting speeds are calculated on the assumption that optimum cutting conditions exist. These include:

- Metal removal rate (finishing cuts that remove a small amount of material may be run at increased speeds)
- Full and constant flow of cutting fluid (adequate cooling and chip flushing)
- Rigidity of the machine and tooling setup (reduction in vibration or chatter)
- Continuity of cut (as compared to an interrupted cut, such as machining square section material in a lathe)
- Condition of material (mill scale, hard spots due to white cast iron forming in castings)

The cutting speed is given as a set of constants that are available from the material manufacturer or supplier. The most common materials are available in reference books or charts, but will always be subject to adjustment depending on the cutting conditions. The following table gives the cutting speeds for a selection of common materials under one set of conditions. The conditions are a tool life of 1 hour, dry cutting (no coolant), and at medium feeds, so they may appear to be incorrect depending on circumstances. These cutting speeds may change if, for instance, adequate coolant is available or an improved grade of HSS is used (such as one that includes [cobalt]).

Cutting speeds for various materials using a plain high-speed steel cutter
Material type	Meters per min (MPM)	Surface feet per min (SFM)
Steel (tough)	18–50	60–100
Mild Steel	3–38	10–125
Mild Steel (with coolant)	6–7	20–25
Cast Iron (medium)	1–2	6–8
Alloy Steels (1320–9262)	3–20	12–65
Carbon Steels (C1008–C1095)	4–51	0–70
Free Cutting Steels (B1111–B1113 & C1108–C1213)	35–69	115–225
Stainless Steels (300 & 400 series)	23–40	30–75
Bronzes	24–45	10–80
Leaded Steel (Leadloy 12L14)	91	30
Aluminium	122-305	400-1000
Brass	90–210	300–700
Machinable Wax	6	20
Acetal Copolymer (Delrin)	11	35
Polyethylene	12	40
Acrylic (with coolant)	15	50
Wood	183–305	600–1000

=== Machinability rating ===
The machinability rating of a material attempts to quantify the machinability of various materials. It is expressed as a percentage or a normalized value. The American Iron and Steel Institute (AISI) determined machinability ratings for a wide variety of materials by running turning tests at 180 surface feet per minute (sfpm). It then arbitrarily assigned 160 Brinell B1112 steel a machinability rating of 100%. The machinability rating is determined by measuring the weighted averages of the normal cutting speed, surface finish, and tool life for each material. Note that a material with a machinability rating less than 100% would be more difficult to machine than B1112 and material and a value more than 100% would be easier.

Machinability ratings can be used in conjunction with the Taylor tool life equation, VT^{n} = C in order to determine cutting speeds or tool life. It is known that B1112 has a tool life of 60 minutes at a cutting speed of 100 sfpm. If a material has a machinability rating of 70%, it can be determined, with the above knowns, that in order to maintain the same tool life (60 minutes), the cutting speed must be 70 sfpm (assuming the same tooling is used).

When calculating for copper alloys, the machine rating is arrived at by assuming the 100 rating of 600 SFM. For example, phosphorus bronze (grades A–D) has a machinability rating of 20. This means that phosphor bronze runs at 20% the speed of 600 SFM or 120 SFM. However, 165 SFM is generally accepted as the basic 100% rating for "grading steels". Formula Cutting Speed (V)= [πDN]/1000 m/min Where D=Diameter of Workpiece in meter or millimeter N=Spindle Speed in rpm

== Spindle speed ==
The spindle speed is the rotational frequency of the spindle of the machine, measured in revolutions per minute (RPM). The preferred speed is determined by working backward from the desired surface speed (sfm or m/min) and incorporating the diameter (of workpiece or cutter).

The spindle may hold the:

- Material (as in a lathe chuck)
- Drill bit in a drill
- Milling cutter in a milling machine
- Router bit in a wood router
- Shaper cutter or knife in a wood shaper or spindle moulder
- Grinding wheel on a grinding machine.

Excessive spindle speed will cause premature tool wear, breakages, and can cause tool chatter, all of which can lead to potentially dangerous conditions. Using the correct spindle speed for the material and tools will greatly enhance tool life and the quality of the surface finish.

For a given machining operation, the cutting speed will remain constant for most situations; therefore the spindle speed will also remain constant. However, facing, forming, parting off, and recess operations on a lathe or screw machine involve the machining of a constantly changing diameter. Ideally, this means changing the spindle speed as the cut advances across the face of the workpiece, producing constant surface speed (CSS). Mechanical arrangements to effect CSS have existed for centuries, but they were never applied commonly to machine tool control. In the pre-CNC era, the ideal of CSS was ignored for most work. For unusual work that demanded it, special pains were taken to achieve it. The introduction of CNC-controlled lathes has provided a practical, everyday solution via automated CSS Machining Process Monitoring and Control. By means of the machine's software and variable speed electric motors, the lathe can increase the RPM of the spindle as the cutter gets closer to the center of the part.

Grinding wheels are designed to be run at a maximum safe speed, the spindle speed of the grinding machine may be variable but this should only be changed with due attention to the safe working speed of the wheel. As a wheel wears it will decrease in diameter, and its effective cutting speed will be reduced. Some grinders have the provision to increase the spindle speed, which corrects for this loss of cutting ability; however, increasing the speed beyond the wheels rating will destroy the wheel and create a serious hazard to life and limb.

Generally speaking, spindle speeds and feed rates are less critical in woodworking than metalworking. Most woodworking machines, including power saws such as circular saws and band saws, jointers, and thickness planers, rotate at a fixed RPM. In those machines, cutting speed is regulated through the feed rate. The required feed rate can be extremely variable depending on the power of the motor, the hardness of the wood or other material being machined, and the sharpness of the cutting tool.

In woodworking, the ideal feed rate is one that is slow enough not to bog down the motor, yet fast enough to avoid burning the material. Certain woods, such as black cherry and maple are more prone to burning than others. The right feed rate is usually obtained by "feel" if the material is hand fed, or by trial and error if a power feeder is used. In thicknessers (planers), the wood is usually fed automatically through rubber or corrugated steel rollers. Some of these machines allow varying the feed rate, usually by changing pulleys. A slower feed rate usually results in a finer surface as more cuts are made for any length of wood.

Spindle speed becomes important in the operation of routers, spindle moulders or shapers, and drills. Older and smaller routers often rotate at a fixed spindle speed, usually between 20,000 and 25,000 rpm. While these speeds are fine for small router bits, using larger bits, say more than 1-inch (25 mm) or 25 millimeters in diameter, can be dangerous and can lead to chatter. Larger routers now have variable speeds and larger bits require slower speed. Drilling wood generally uses higher spindle speeds than metal, and the speed is not as critical. However, larger diameter drill bits do require slower speeds to avoid burning.

Cutting feeds and speeds, and the spindle speeds that are derived from them, are the ideal cutting conditions for a tool. If the conditions are less than ideal then adjustments are made to the spindle's speed, this adjustment is usually a reduction in RPM to the closest available speed, or one that is deemed (through knowledge and experience) to be correct.

Some materials, such as machinable wax, can be cut at a wide variety of spindle speeds, while others, such as stainless steel require much more careful control as the cutting speed is critical, to avoid overheating both the cutter and workpiece. Stainless steel is one material that hardens very easily under cold working, therefore insufficient feed rate or incorrect spindle speed can lead to less than ideal cutting conditions as the work piece will quickly harden and resist the tool's cutting action. The liberal application of cutting fluid can improve these cutting conditions; however, the correct selection of speeds is the critical factor.

=== Spindle speed calculations ===
Most metalworking books have nomograms or tables of spindle speeds and feed rates for different cutters and workpiece materials; similar tables are also likely available from the manufacturer of the cutter used.

The spindle speeds may be calculated for all machining operations once the SFM or MPM is known. In most cases, we are dealing with a cylindrical object such as a milling cutter or a workpiece turning in a lathe so we need to determine the speed at the periphery of this round object. This speed at the periphery (of a point on the circumference, moving past a stationary point) will depend on the rotational speed (RPM) and diameter of the object.

One analogy would be a skateboard rider and a bicycle rider travelling side by side along the road. For a given surface speed (the speed of this pair along the road) the rotational speed (RPM) of their wheels (large for the skater and small for the bicycle rider) will be different. This rotational speed (RPM) is what we are calculating, given a fixed surface speed (speed along the road) and known values for their wheel sizes (cutter or workpiece).

The following formulae may be used to estimate this value.

==== Approximation ====
The exact RPM is not always needed, a close approximation will work. For instance, a machinist may want to take the value of ${\pi }$ to be 3 if performing calculations by hand.

$$RPM = {Cutting Speed\times 12 \over \pi \times Diameter}$$

e.g. for a cutting speed of 100 ft/min (a plain HSS steel cutter on mild steel) and diameter of 10 inches (the cutter or the work piece)

$$RPM = {Cutting Speed\times 12 \over \pi \times Diameter} = {12 \times 100 ft/min \over 3 \times 10 inches} = {40 revs/min}$$

and, for an example using metric values, where the cutting speed is 30 m/min and a diameter of 10 mm (0.01 m),

$$RPM = {Speed \over \pi \times Diameter} = { 1000 \times 30 m/min \over 3 \times 10 mm} = {1000  revs/min}$$

==== Accuracy ====
However, for more accurate calculations, and at the expense of simplicity, this formula can be used:

$$RPM = {Speed \over Circumference}={Speed \over \pi \times Diameter}$$

and using the same example

$$RPM = {100 ft/min \over \pi \times 10 \, inches \left ( \frac{1 ft}{12 \, inches} \right )} = {100 \over 2.62} = 38.2 revs/min$$

and using the same example as above

$$RPM = {30 m/min \over \pi \times 10 \, mm \left ( \frac{1 m}{1000 \, mm} \right )} = {1000*30 \over \pi*10} = 955 revs/min$$

where:

- RPM is the rotational speed of the cutter or workpiece.
- Speed is the recommended cutting speed of the material in meters/minute or feet/min
- Diameter in millimeters or inches.

== Feed rate ==
Feed rate is the velocity at which the cutter is fed, that is, advanced against the workpiece. It is expressed in units of distance per revolution for turning and boring (typically inches per revolution [ipr] or millimeters per revolution). It can be expressed thus for milling also, but it is often expressed in units of distance per time for milling (typically inches per minute [ipm] or millimeters per minute), with considerations of how many teeth (or flutes) the cutter has then determined what that means for each tooth.

Feed rate is dependent on the:

- Type of tool (a small drill or a large drill, high speed or carbide, a boxtool or recess, a thin form tool or wide form tool, a slide knurl or a turret straddle knurl).
- Surface finish desired.
- Power available at the spindle (to prevent stalling of the cutter or workpiece).
- Rigidity of the machine and tooling setup (ability to withstand vibration or chatter).
- Strength of the workpiece (high feed rates will collapse thin wall tubing)
- Characteristics of the material being cut, chip flow depends on material type and feed rate. The ideal chip shape is small and breaks free early, carrying heat away from the tool and work.
- Threads per inch (TPI) for taps, die heads and threading tools.
- Cut Width. Any time the width of cut is less than half the diameter, a geometric phenomenon called Chip Thinning reduces the actual chipload. Feedrates need to be increased to offset the effects of chip thinning, both for productivity and to avoid rubbing which reduces tool life.

When deciding what feed rate to use for a certain cutting operation, the calculation is fairly straightforward for single-point cutting tools, because all of the cutting work is done at one point (done by "one tooth", as it were). With a milling machine or jointer, where multi-tipped/multi-fluted cutting tools are involved, then the desired feed rate becomes dependent on the number of teeth on the cutter, as well as the desired amount of material per tooth to cut (expressed as chip load). The greater the number of cutting edges, the higher the feed rate permissible: for a cutting edge to work efficiently it must remove sufficient material to cut rather than rub; it also must do its fair share of work.

The ratio of the spindle speed and the feed rate controls how aggressive the cut is, and the nature of the swarf formed.

=== Formula to determine feed rate ===
This formula can be used to figure out the feed rate that the cutter travels into or around the work. This would apply to cutters on a milling machine, drill press and a number of other machine tools. This is not to be used on the lathe for turning operations, as the feed rate on a lathe is given as feed per revolution.

$FR = {RPM \times T \times CL}$

Where:

- FR = the calculated feed rate in inches per minute or mm per minute.
- RPM = is the calculated speed for the cutter.
- T = Number of teeth on the cutter.
- CL = The chip load or feed per tooth. This is the size of chip that each tooth of the cutter takes.

== Depth of cut ==
Cutting speed and feed rate come together with depth of cut to determine the material removal rate, which is the volume of workpiece material (metal, wood, plastic, etc.) that can be removed per time unit.

== Interrelationship of theory and practice ==
Speed-and-feed selection is analogous to other examples of applied science, such as meteorology or pharmacology, in that the theoretical modeling is necessary and useful but can never fully predict the reality of specific cases because of the massively multivariate environment. Just as weather forecasts or drug dosages can be modeled with fair accuracy, but never with complete certainty, machinists can predict with charts and formulas the approximate speed and feed values that will work best on a particular job, but cannot know the exact optimal values until running the job. In CNC machining, usually the programmer programs speeds and feedrates that are as maximally tuned as calculations and general guidelines can supply. The operator then fine-tunes the values while running the machine, based on sights, sounds, smells, temperatures, tolerance holding, and tool tip lifespan. Under proper management, the revised values are captured for future use, so that when a program is run again later, this work need not be duplicated.

As with meteorology and pharmacology, however, the interrelationship of theory and practice has been developing over decades as the theory part of the balance becomes more advanced thanks to information technology. For example, an effort called the Machine Tool Genome Project is working toward providing the computer modeling (simulation) needed to predict optimal speed-and-feed combinations for particular setups in any internet-connected shop with less local experimentation and testing. Instead of the only option being the measuring and testing of the behavior of its own equipment, it will benefit from others' experience and simulation; in a sense, rather than 'reinventing a wheel', it will be able to 'make better use of existing wheels already developed by others in remote locations'.

== Academic research examples ==
Speeds and feeds have been studied scientifically since at least the 1890s. The work is typically done in engineering laboratories, with the funding coming from three basic roots: corporations, governments (including their militaries), and universities. All three types of institution have invested large amounts of money in the cause, often in collaborative partnerships. Examples of such work are highlighted below.

In the 1890s through 1910s, Frederick Winslow Taylor performed turning experiments that became famous (and seminal). He developed Taylor's Equation for Tool Life Expectancy.

Scientific study by Holz and De Leeuw of the Cincinnati Milling Machine Company did for milling cutters what F. W. Taylor had done for single-point cutters.

"Following World War II, many new alloys were developed. New standards were needed to increase [U.S.] American productivity. Metcut Research Associates, with technical support from the Air Force Materials Laboratory and the Army Science and Technology Laboratory, published the first Machining Data Handbook in 1966. The recommended speeds and feeds provided in this book were the result of extensive testing to determine optimum tool life under controlled conditions for every material of the day, operation and hardness."

A study on the effect of the variation of cutting parameters in the surface integrity in turning of an AISI 304 stainless steel revealed that the feed rate has the greatest impairing effect on the quality of the surface, and that besides the achievement of the desired roughness profile, it is necessary to analyze the effect of speed and feed on the creation of micropits and microdefects on the machined surface. Moreover, they found that the conventional empirical relation that relates feed rate to roughness value does not fit adequately for low cutting speeds. However, surface roughness in conventional machining operations depends on a large number of factors related to the cutting tool, machine tool, fixture, workpiece, and cutting/process parameters.

== Bibliography ==
- Brown & Sharpe. "Brown and Sharpe Speeds and Feeds Chart". Automatic Screw Machine Handbook. Providence, R.I.: Brown & Sharpe Manufacturing Co.
- Brown & Sharpe 2. "Cam & Tool Design: Surface Cutting Speeds Chart". Automatic Screw Machine Handbook. Providence, R.I.: Brown & Sharpe Manufacturing Co.
- Brown & Sharpe 3. "Machinebility of Materials, Composition and Machinability Chart". Automatic Screw Machine Handbook. Providence, R.I.: Brown & Sharpe Manufacturing Co.
- Culley, Ron (1988). Fitting and machining. Melbourne, Victoria: RMIT Publications. ISBN 0-7241-3819-6.
- Flórez Orrego, Daniel Alexander; Varela Jiménez, Luis Bernardo; Escobar Atehortua, Julian David; López Ochoa, Diana María (25 November 2010). Effect of the variation of cutting parameters in surface integrity in turning processing of an AISI 304 austenitic stainless steel (PDF). International Brazilian Conference on Tribology: TriboBr. Rio de Janeiro. ISSN 2179-3956.
- Smid, Peter (2003). "Feed Rate Equation". CNC Programming Handbook. Industrial Press, Inc. ISBN 9780831131586.
- Smid, Peter (2008), CNC Programming Handbook (3rd ed.), New York: Industrial Press, ISBN 9780831133474, LCCN 2007045901.
- Taylor, Frederick Winslow (1907), On the art of cutting metals, Philadelphia, Pennsylvania, USA: ASME.
- Woodbury, Robert S. (1972), Studies in the history of machine tools, Cambridge, MA, USA: MIT Press, ISBN 9780262730334.
- Zelinski, Peter (2010-12-15). "The Online Optimizer: Coming soon: The Machine Tool Genome Project promises to let almost any machine shop use its machining centers more productively. Shops will benefit from tap-test findings without personally tapping any of their own machines or tools". Modern Machine Shop. 83 (9). Cincinnati, Ohio, USA: Gardner Publications Inc: 70–73.
- Abellán-Nebot, José V.; Vila Pastor, Carlos; Siller, Hector R. (26 February 2024). "A Review of the Factors Influencing Surface Roughness in Machining and Their Impact on Sustainability". Sustainability. ISSN 2071-1050.

=== Further reading ===
- Groover, Mikell P. (2007). "Theory of Metal Machining". Fundamentals of Modern Manufacturing (3rd ed.). John Wiley & Sons, Inc. pp. 491–504. ISBN 978-0-471-74485-6.
