= Cutting tool (machining) =

Hardened tool used to cut material from the workpiece

In the context of machining, a cutting tool or cutter is typically a hardened metal tool that is used to cut, shape, and remove material from a workpiece by means of machining tools as well as abrasive tools by way of shear deformation. The majority of these tools are designed for metals, but are also used on hard rubber, synthetic resins, slate, marble, and other materials.

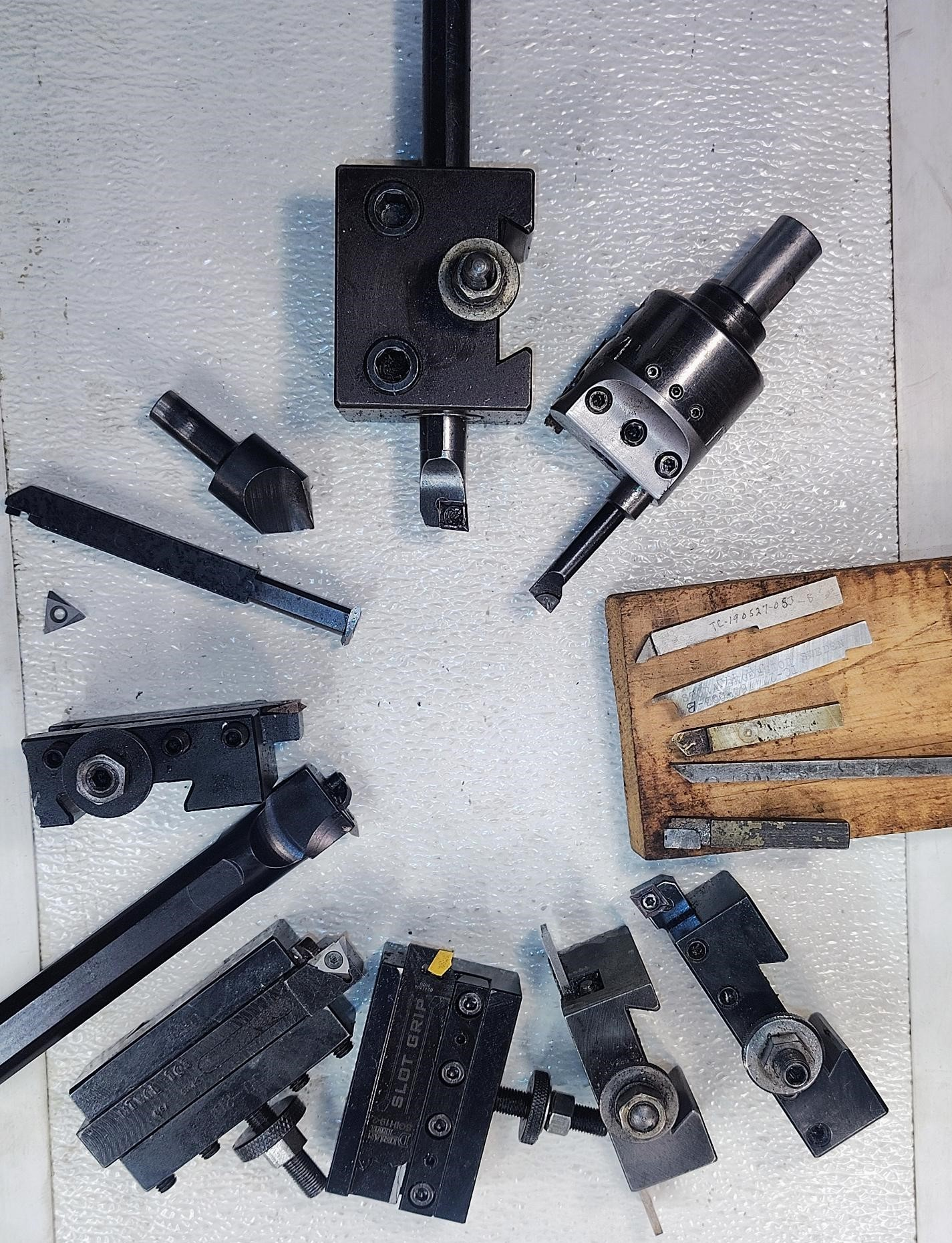
Single-edged cutting tools, some in holders (top going clockwise): boring bar, boring bar, various lathe tools (on wood), lathe tool, parting tool, parting tool, four threaders, chamfer

There are several different types of single-edge cutting tools that are made from a variety of hardened metal alloys that are ground to a specific shape in order to perform a specific part of the turning process resulting in a finished machined part. Single-edge cutting tools are used mainly in the turning operations performed by a lathe in which they vary in size as well as alloy composition depending on the size and the type of material being turned. These cutting tools are held stationary by what is known as a tool post. Single-edge cutting tools are also the means of cutting material performed by shaping machines and planing machines, which remove material by means of one cutting edge.

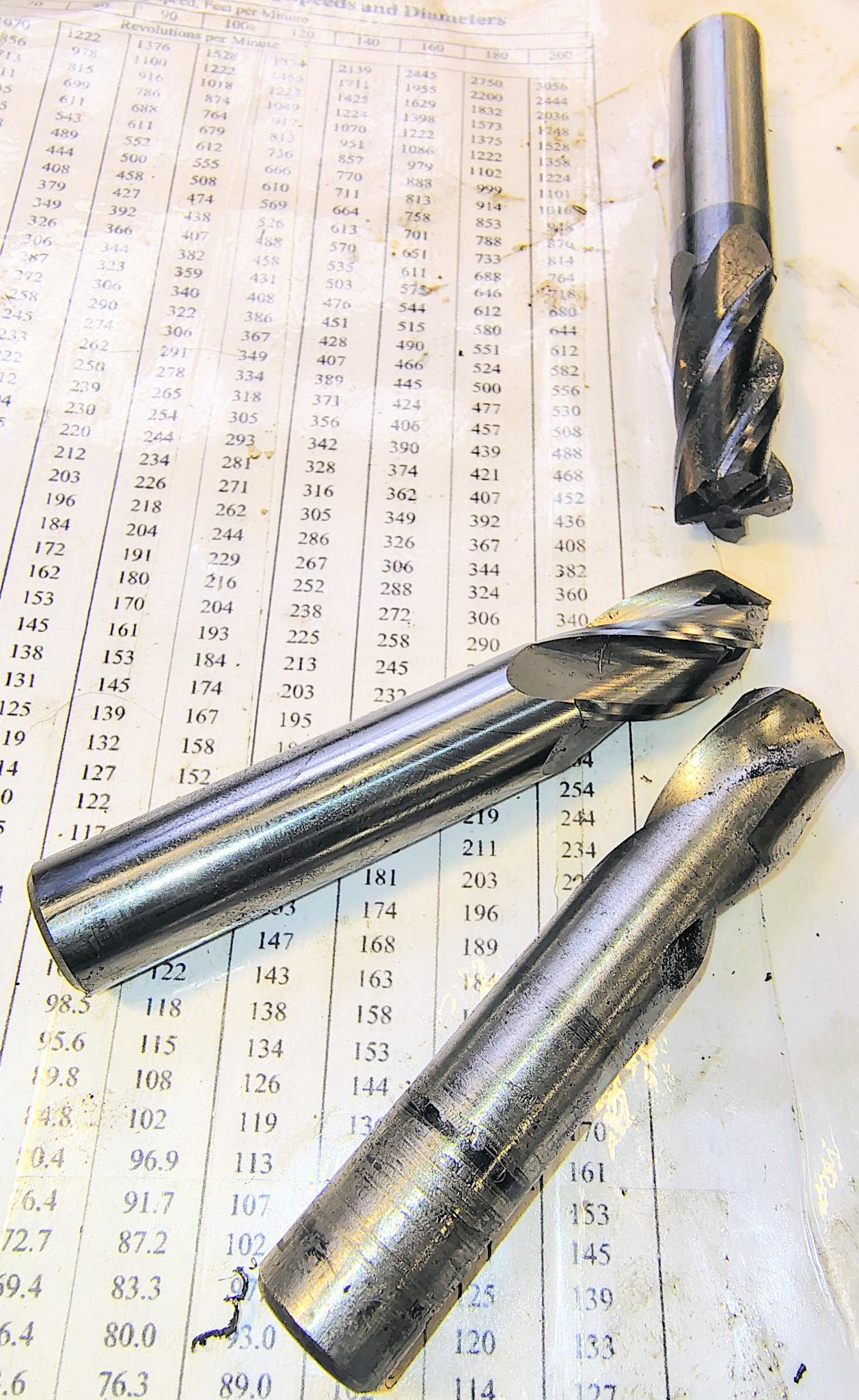
Center cutting 1/2" end mill (top), chamfering 1/2" end mill (left), 1/2" drill bit (bottom)

Milling tools are often multipoint tools, that, while sometimes near identical in appearance, are distinguished from drill bits in its application, geometry, and manufacture. While a drill bit can only cut in the axial direction (drilling), most milling bits can cut in the radial direction. Near all drill bits have two cutting edges that are ground into equally tapered angles that cut through the material by applying downward rotational force. Endmills or milling bits, also cut material by rotational force. These tools do more than put holes in a workpiece, they cut by horizontal shear deformation in which the workpiece is brought into the tool as it's rotating. The tool path is determined by the movement of the table that is holding the workpiece in place. This table is designed to accept a variety of vises and clamping tools so that the affixed workpiece can move into the cutter at various angles and directions. There are multiple different types of endmills that perform a different milling actions.

Grinding stones are tools that contain several different cutting edges which encompasses the entirety of the stone. Unlike metallic cutting tools, these grinding stones never go dull. In fact the formation of cutting edges of metallic cutting tools are achieved by the use of grinding wheels and other hard abrasives. There are several different types of grinding stone wheels that are used to grind several different types of metals. Although these stones are not metal, they need to be harder than the metal that they grind. In contrast to the grinding stone, if the hardness of the metal exceeds that of the stone, the metal will cut the stone. This is not ideal. Each grain of abrasive functions as a microscopic single-point cutting edge (although of high negative rake angle), and shears a tiny chip.

Cutting tool materials must be harder than the material which is to be cut, and the tool must be able to withstand the heat and force generated in the metal-cutting process. Also, the tool must have a specific geometry, with clearance angles designed so that the cutting edge can contact the workpiece without the rest of the tool dragging on the workpiece surface. The angle of the cutting face is also important, as is the flute width, number of flutes or teeth, and margin size. In order to have a long working life, all of the above must be optimized, plus the speeds and feeds at which the tool is run.

== Types ==
Linear cutting tools include tool bits (single-point cutting tools) and broaches. Rotary cutting tools include drill bits, countersinks and counterbores, taps and dies, reamers, and cold saw blades. Other cutting tools, such as bandsaw blades, hacksaw blades, and fly cutters, combine aspects of linear and rotary motion. The majority of these types of cutting tools are often made from HSS (High-Speed-Steel).

=== Cutting tools with inserts (indexable tools) ===
Cutting tools are often designed with inserts or replaceable tips (tipped tools). In these, the cutting edge consists of a separate piece of material, either brazed, welded or clamped on to the tool body. Common materials for tips include cemented carbide, polycrystalline diamond, and cubic boron nitride. Tools using inserts include milling cutters (endmills, fly cutters), tool bits, and saw blades.

=== Tool setup ===
The detailed instructions of how to combine the tool assembly out of basic holder, tool and insert can be stored in a tool management solution.

== Cutting edge ==
The cutting edge of a cutting tool is a very important for the performance of the cutting process. The main features of the cutting edge are:

- form of the cutting edge: radius or waterfall or trumpet (reverse waterfall)
- cutting edge angles
- form and size of the chamfers

The measurement of the cutting edge is performed using a tactile instrument or an instrument using focus variation. To quantify a cutting edge the following parameters are used:

- cutting edge radius for symmetric edges
- cutting edge ellipse axis for asymmetric edges
- factor K, this is the relation between Sγ and Sα. This can also be calculated by the ratio of the two axes of the ellipse. This factor describes the form of the cutting edge.
- 3 angles: clearance angle, wedge angle, rake (chipping) angle
- Δr
- length and orientation of the bevel

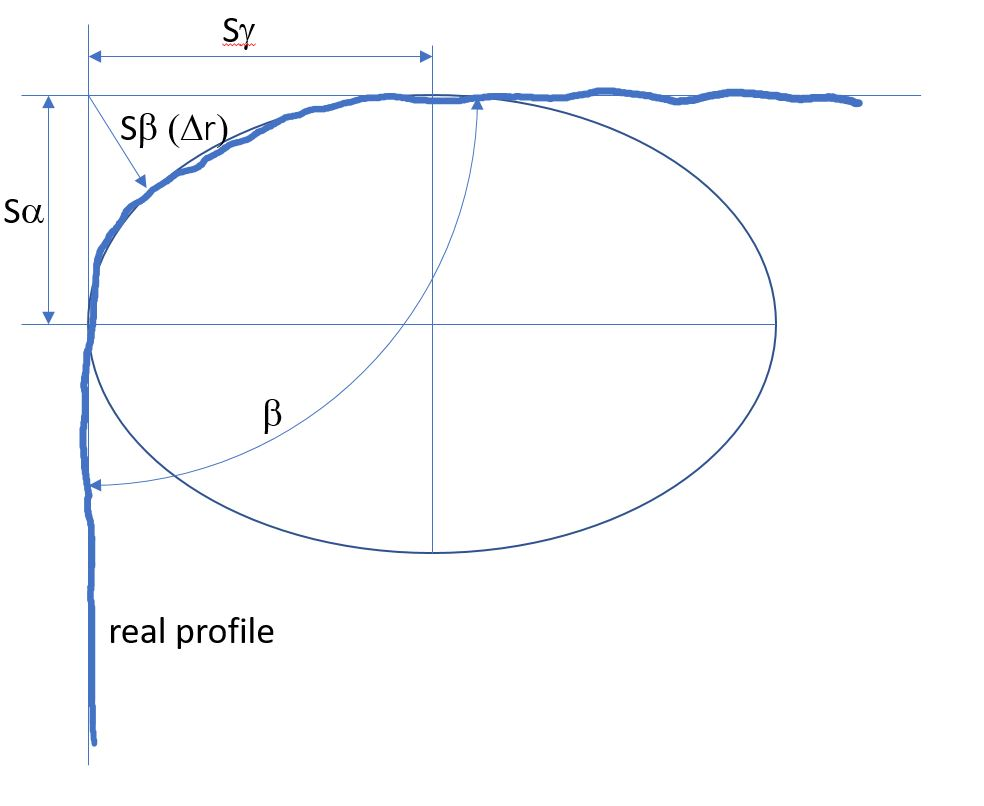
Cutting edge profile with parameters

One of the most important cutting edge parameters is the K factor. It specifies the form of the cutting edge. 1 means a symmetric cutting edge. If the value is smaller than 1 the form is called a waterfall. If the value is larger than 1 it is called a trumpet. Depending on the material being cut, feed rate and other factors, a cutting tool with the optimum K factor should be used.
