= Tipped tool =

Cutting tool whose cutting edge is a separate piece of material

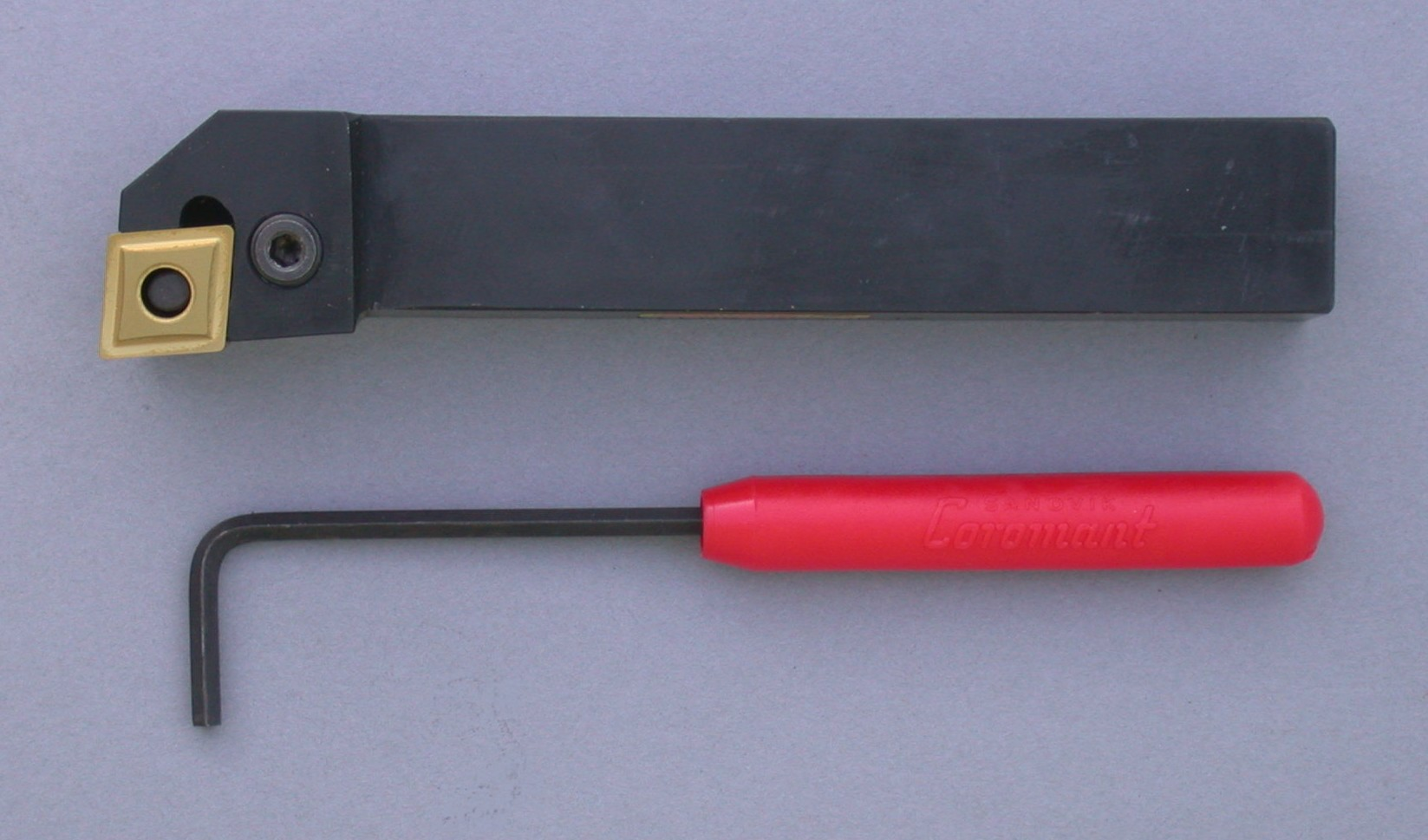
Carbide tipped turning tool and wrench

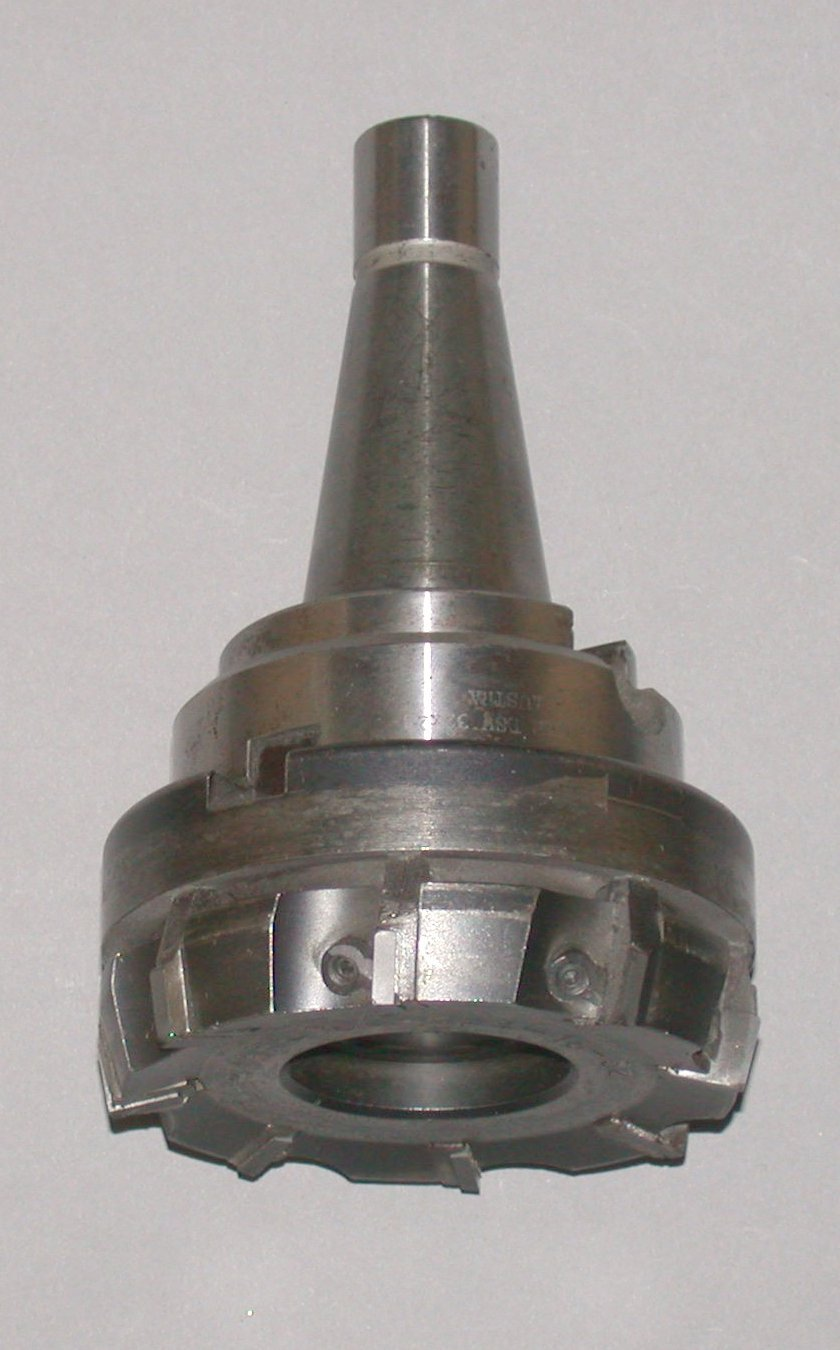
Carbide tipped face mill

A tipped tool is any cutting tool in which the cutting edge consists of a separate piece of material that is brazed, welded, or clamped onto a body made of another material. In the types in which the cutter portion is an indexable part clamped by a screw, the cutters are called inserts (because they are inserted into the tool body). Tipped tools allow each part of the tool, the shank and the cutter(s), to be made of the material with the best properties for its job. Common materials for the cutters (brazed tips or clamped inserts) include cemented carbide, polycrystalline diamond, and cubic boron nitride. Tools that are commonly tipped include milling cutters (such as end mills, face mills, and fly cutters), tool bits, router bits, and saw blades (especially the metal-cutting ones).

== Advantages and disadvantages ==
The advantage of tipped tools is only a small insert of the cutting material is needed to provide the cutting ability. The small size makes manufacturing of the insert easier than making a solid tool of the same material. This also reduces cost because the tool holder can be made of a less-expensive and tougher material. In some situations a tipped tool is better than its solid counterpart because it combines the toughness of the tool holder with the hardness of the insert.

In other situations this is less than optimal, because the joint between the tool holder and the insert reduces rigidity. However, these tools may still be used because the overall cost savings is still greater.

In industry today, insert tools are perhaps slightly more common than solid tools, but solid tools are still used in many applications. Entire catalogs of solid–high-speed steel (HSS) and solid-carbide end mills, for example, play prominent parts in some areas of milling practice, including diesinking, moldmaking, and aerospace job or batch production. Most machine shops with lathes have many solid-HSS and solid-carbide tool bits as well as many insert-tipped tool bits, and most commercial operations that involve routers (such as cabinetry and furniture shops) use plenty of solid-HSS and solid-carbide router bits as well as some tipped bits.

== Indexable inserts ==
Inserts are removable cutting tips, which means they are not brazed or welded to the tool body. They are usually indexable, meaning that they can be exchanged, and often also rotated or flipped, without disturbing the overall geometry of the tool (effective diameter, tool length offset, etc.). This saves time in manufacturing by allowing fresh cutting edges to be presented periodically without the need for tool grinding, setup changes, or entering of new values into a CNC program.

=== Wiper insert ===
A wiper insert is an insert used in a milling machine or a lathe. It is designed for finished cutting, to give a smooth surface on the surface being cut. It uses special geometry to give a good finish on the workpiece at a higher-than-normal feedrate. Wiper inserts generally have a larger area in contact with the workpiece, so they exert higher force on the workpiece. This makes them unsuitable for fragile workpieces.

=== ISO insert coding ===
ISO1832 insert designation system.

Inserts used for turning and milling are often numbered according to ISO standard 1832. This standard aims to make the naming, specifying and ordering of inserts a simple, consistent and traceable process. This standard takes into account both metric and imperial systems of units, although certain elements differ for each unit system. The code consists of up to 13 symbols with the first 12 of them being compulsory for inserts composed of cubic boron or poly-crystalline diamond and the first 7 being compulsory for all other types of composition.

== See also ==
- Diamond tools
- Diamond blade
