= Swarf =

Filing debris or waste resulting from manufacturing processes

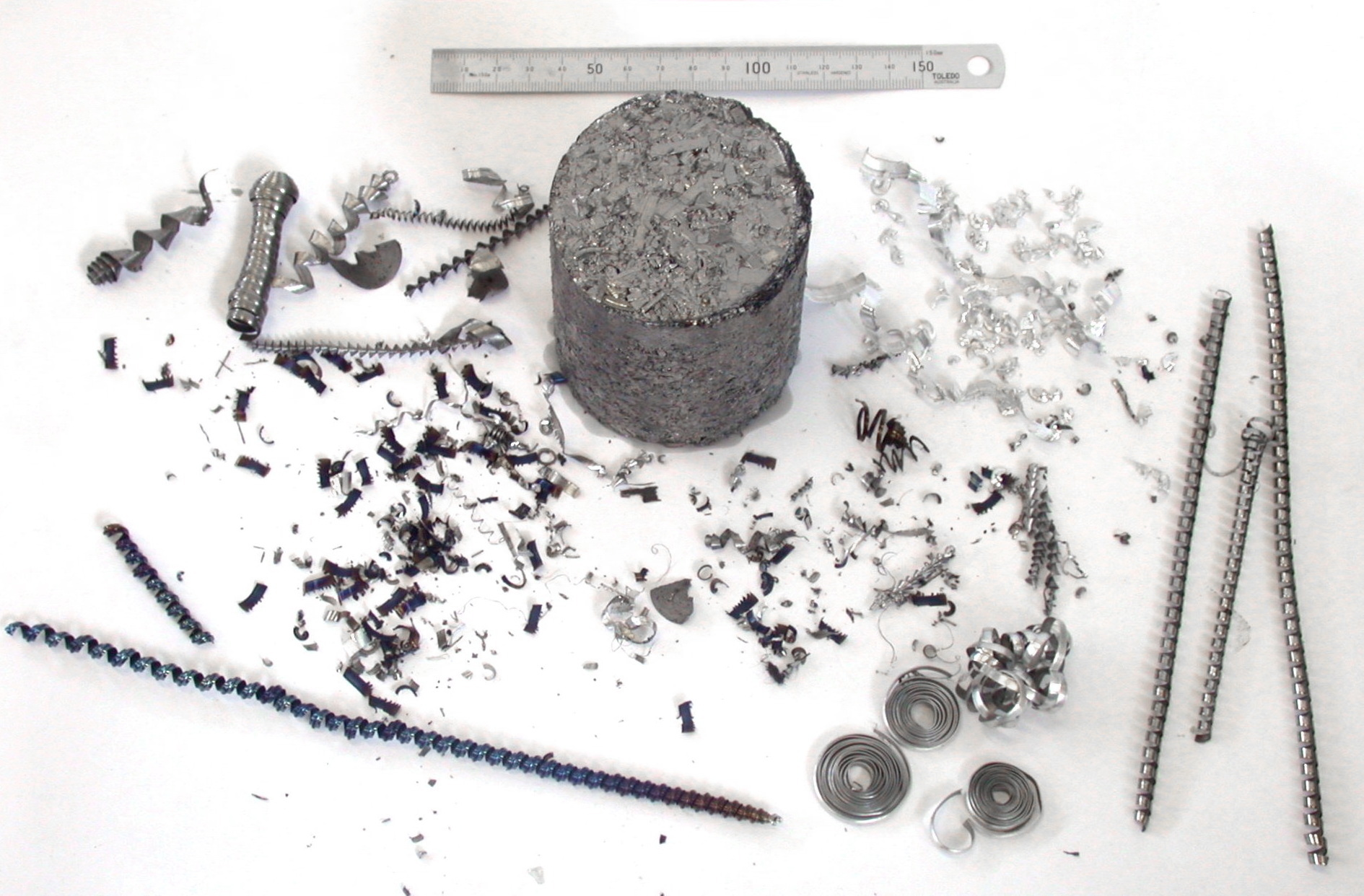
Various examples of swarf, including a block of compressed swarf

Swarf, also known as chips or by other process-specific names (such as turnings, filings, or shavings), are pieces of metal, wood, or plastic that are the debris or waste resulting from machining, woodworking, or similar subtractive (material-removing) manufacturing processes. Swarf can be small particles (such as the gritty swarf from grinding metal or the sawdust from sawing or sanding wood); long, stringy tendrils (such as the springy chips from turning tough metals, or long shavings from whittling); slag-like waste (such as is produced within pipe during pipefitting work); or stone fragments and dust (as in masonry).

Some of these terms are mass nouns (such as swarf and sawdust) and some of them are count nouns (such as chips, filings, or shavings).

Wood swarf is discussed at sawdust.

== Metal swarf ==
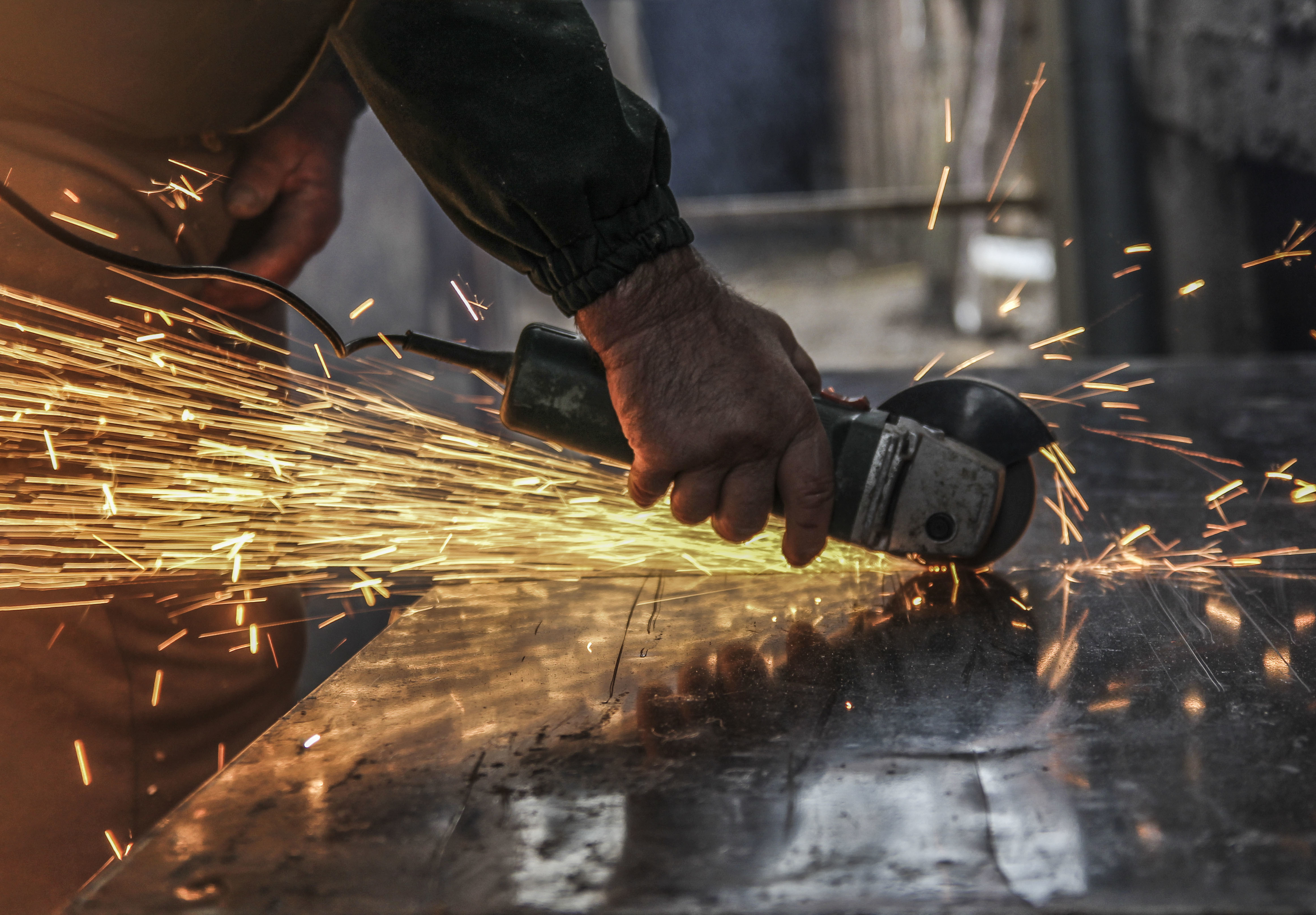
Metal grinding produces grinding swarf.

Chips can be extremely sharp and they can cause serious injuries if not handled correctly. It is not uncommon for chips flying off the cutter to be ejected with great force and to fly several yards.

Due to its high surface area, swarf composed of some reactive metals can be highly flammable. Swarf may also spontaneously combust, especially if the swarf is coated with cutting oil. To extinguish swarf fires, a special fire extinguisher is needed, designed for fighting Class D (metal) fires.

When machining without coolant, swarf is usually very hot and can easily burn the machine operator. Machinists typically wear long pants, eye protection and other personal protective equipment for this reason.

Some engineering materials such as beryllium are toxic when finely divided into dust or swarf and appropriate measures must be taken to prevent exposure.

For ease of transport and handling, swarf may be compressed into bricks. Metal swarf can usually be recycled.

== See also ==
- Particulates
