= Fay automatic lathe =

Machine tool

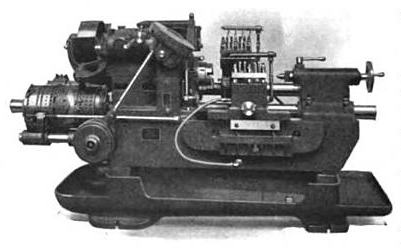
Fay automatic lathe

The Fay automatic lathe was an automatic lathe tailored to cutting workpieces that were mounted on centers (tools with pointed ends to accurately position a center-drilled workpiece about an axis, either directly or by using a mandrel). It could also do chucking work (feeding of unformed blanks or pieces of stock from a magazine to be automatically gripped by the machine for turning). Examples of workpieces included automotive steering knuckles and transmission gears, and such work done on mandrels as flanges, disks, and hubs. The machine tool was developed by F.C. Fay of Philadelphia and improved by Otto A. Schaum. It was originally manufactured by the Fay & Scott Machine Shop. James Hartness acquired manufacturing rights on behalf of the Jones & Lamson Machine Company and manufactured an improved version, developed under the management of Ralph Flanders.

In 1937 Roe, writing for the American Society of Mechanical Engineers, framed the importance of the Fay automatic lathe to the capabilities of machine tools by saying that, "This machine does for the engine lathe what Spencer did for the old hand-operated turret lathe." These machines took an entire class of turned work formerly requiring an operator to execute the series of movements necessary to shape a piece of metal (manual control) and allowed the same work to be done automatically. This step forward in automation lowered a manufacturer's unit expense per part by reducing labor costs. Numerically controlled (CNC) machine tools such as turning centers, turn-mills, and rotary transfer machines have largely supplanted cam-operated automatics.

== Bibliography ==
- ASME (1921), A.S.M.E. mechanical catalog and directory, Volume 11, American Society of Mechanical Engineers.
- Flanders, Ralph E. (1913), The Fay automatic lathe: a machine for the automatic turning of work held on centers or on centered arbors, Jones & Lamson Machine Company.
- Flanders, Ralph E. (1921), "Cost-reducing Tooling Equipment--Tooling Equipments Employed for Machining Steering Knuckles and Other Automotibile Forgings at a High Rate of Production", in French, Lester G. (ed.), Machinery, Index to Vol. XXVII September 1921-August 1922, New York: The Industrial Press, pp. 301–305.
- Flanders, Ralph E. (1922), "Tooling Equipment for Automobile Gears and Ball Races", in French, Lester G. (ed.), Machinery, Index to Vol. XXVII September 1921-August 1922, New York: The Industrial Press, pp. 447–451.
- Roe, Joseph Wickham (1937), James Hartness: A Representative of the Machine Age at Its Best, New York: American Society of Mechanical Engineers, LCCN 37016470, OCLC 3456642. link from HathiTrust.
