= Threading (manufacturing) =

Process of creating a screw thread

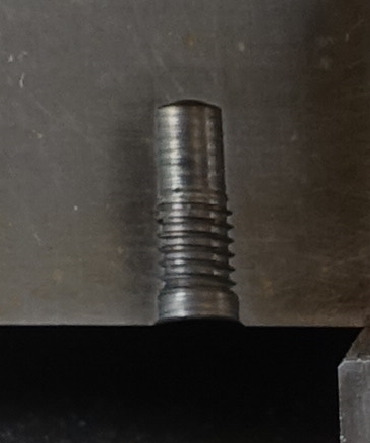
Threading in a piece

In manufacturing, threading is the process of creating a screw thread. More screw threads are produced each year than any other machine element. There are many methods of generating threads, including subtractive methods (many kinds of thread cutting and grinding, as detailed below); deformative or transformative methods (rolling and forming; molding and casting); additive methods (such as 3D printing); or combinations thereof.

== Overview of methods (comparison, selection, etc.) ==
There are various methods for generating screw threads. The method for any one application is chosen based on constraints—time, money, degree of precision needed (or not needed), what equipment is already available, what equipment purchases could be justified based on resulting unit price of the threaded part (which depends on how many parts are planned), etc.

In general, certain thread-generating processes tend to fall along certain portions of the spectrum from toolroom-made parts to mass-produced parts, although there can be considerable overlap. For example, thread lapping following thread grinding would fall only on the extreme toolroom end of the spectrum, while thread rolling is a large and diverse area of practice that is used for everything from microlathe leadscrews (somewhat pricey and very precise) to the cheapest deck screws (very affordable and with precision to spare).

Threads of metal fasteners are usually created on a thread rolling machine. They may also be cut with a lathe, tap or die. Rolled threads are stronger than cut threads, with increases of 10% to 20% in tensile strength and possibly more in fatigue resistance and wear resistance.

Thread milling has a better thread quality than cut tapping as it offers better chip evacuation. Cut tapping uses a tool the same size as the thread, forcing the chip through the thread for evacuation.

== Subtractive methods ==
=== Thread cutting ===
Thread cutting, as compared to thread forming and rolling, is used when full thread depth is required, when the quantity is small, when the blank is not very accurate, when threading up to a shoulder is required, when threading a tapered thread, or when the material is brittle.

==== Taps and dies ====
A common method of threading is cutting with taps and dies. Unlike drill bits, hand taps do not automatically remove the chips they create. A hand tap cannot cut its threads in a single rotation because it creates long chips which quickly jam the tap (an effect known as "crowding"), possibly breaking it. Therefore, in manual thread cutting, normal wrench usage is to cut the threads 1/2 to 2/3 of a turn (180 to 240 degree rotation), then reverse the tap for about 1/6 of a turn (60 degrees) until the chips are broken by the back edges of the cutters. It may be necessary to periodically remove the tap from the hole to clear the chips, especially when a blind hole is threaded.

For continuous tapping operations (i.e., power tapping) specialized spiral point or "gun" taps are used to eject the chips and prevent crowding.

==== Single-point threading ====
Single-point threading, also colloquially called single-pointing (or just thread cutting when the context is implicit), is an operation that uses a single-point tool to produce a thread form on a cylinder or cone. The tool moves linearly while the precise rotation of the workpiece determines the lead of the thread. The process can be done to create external or internal threads (male, e.g. a bolt, or female, e.g. a nut). In external thread cutting, the piece can either be held in a chuck or mounted between two centers. With internal thread cutting, the piece is held in a chuck. The tool moves across the piece linearly, taking chips off the workpiece with each pass. Usually 5 to 7 light cuts create the correct depth of the thread.

The coordination of various machine elements including leadscrew, slide rest, and change gears was the technological advance that allowed the invention of the screw-cutting lathe, which was the origin of single-point threading as we know it today.

Today, engine lathes and CNC lathes are the commonly used machines for single-point threading. On CNC machines, the process is quick and easy (relative to manual control) due to the machine's ability to constantly track the relationship of the tool position and spindle position (called "spindle synchronization"). CNC software includes "canned cycles", that is, preprogrammed subroutines, that obviate the manual programming of a single-point threading cycle.

All threading could feasibly be done using a single-point tool, but because of the high speed and thus low unit cost of other methods (e.g., tapping, die threading, and thread rolling and forming), single-point threading is usually only used when other factors of the manufacturing process happen to favor it (e.g., if only a few threads need to be made, if an unusual or unique thread is required, or if there is a need for very high concentricity with other part features machined during the same setup.)

==== Thread milling ====
A diagram of a solid single-form thread cutting tool

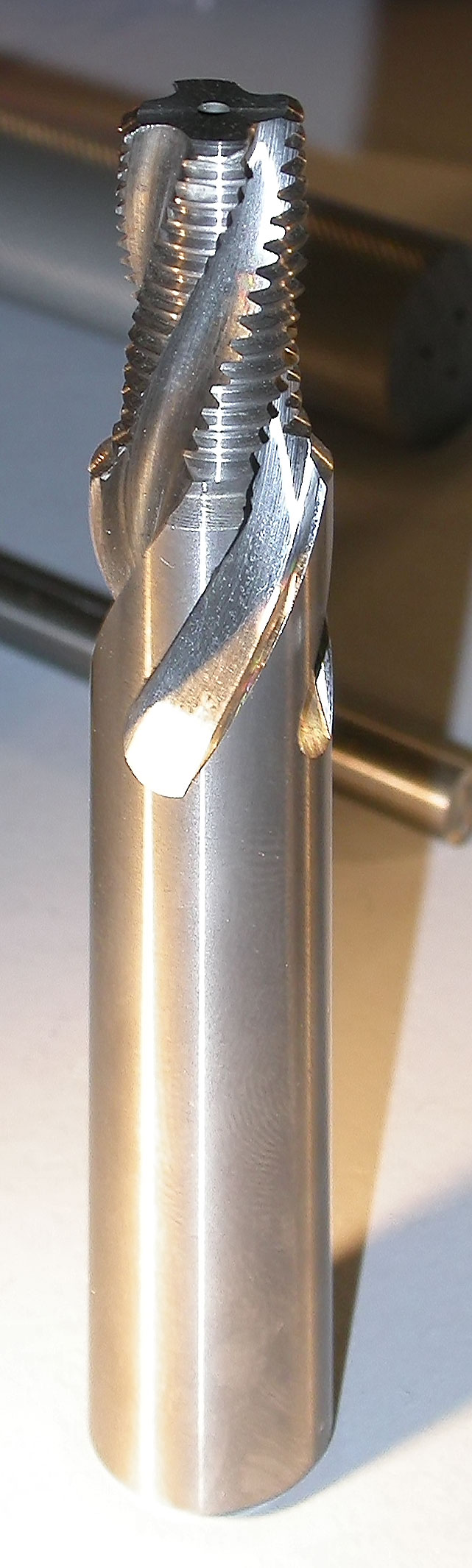
A solid multiple-form thread milling cutter

The path a multiple-form thread cutting tool travels to create an external thread.

Threads may be milled with a rotating milling cutter if the correct helical toolpath can be arranged. This was formerly arranged mechanically, and it was suitable for mass-production work although uncommon in job-shop work. With the widespread dissemination of affordable, fast, precise CNC, it became much more common, and today internal and external threads are often milled even on work where they would formerly have been cut with taps, die heads, or single-pointing. Some advantages of thread milling, as compared to single-point cutting or taps and dies, are faster cycle times, less tool breakage, and that a left- or right-hand thread can be created with the same tool. Additionally, for large, awkward workpieces (such as a fire hydrant casting), it is simply easier to let the workpiece sit stationary on a table while all needed machining operations are performed on it with rotating tools, as opposed to rigging it up for rotation around the axis of each set of threads (that is, for the "arms" and "mouth" of the hydrant).

There are various types of thread milling, including several variants of form-milling and a combination of drilling and threading with one cutter, called thrilling.

One main advantage against tapping, is that tapping only starts making a complete thread profile on the third thread, whereas thread milling will produce a complete thread profile from the top to the bottom.

Form-milling uses either a single- or multiple-form cutter. In one variant of form-milling, the single-form cutter is tilted to the helix angle of the thread and then fed radially into the blank. The blank is then slowly rotated as the cutter is precisely moved along the axis of the blank, which cuts the thread into the blank. This can be done in one pass, if the cutter is fed to the full thread depth, or in two passes, with the first not being to the full thread depth. This process is mainly used on threads larger than 1.5 in (38 mm). It is commonly used to cut large-lead or multiple-lead threads. A similar variant using a multiple-form cutter exists, in which the process completes the thread in one revolution around the blank. The cutter must be longer than the desired thread length. Using a multiple-form cutter is faster than using a single-form cutter but it is limited to threads with a helix angle less than 3°. It is also limited to blanks of a substantial diameter and no longer than 2 in (51 mm).

Another variant of form-milling involves holding the cutter's axis orthogonally (no canting to the thread's helix angle) and feeding the cutter in a toolpath that will generate the thread. The part is usually a stationary workpiece, such as a boss on a valve body (in external thread milling) or a hole in a plate or block (in internal thread milling). This type of thread milling uses essentially the same concept as contouring with an endmill or ball-nose mill, but the cutter and toolpath are arranged specifically to define the "contour" of a thread. The toolpath is achieved either using helical interpolation (which is circular interpolation in one plane [typically XY] with simultaneous linear interpolation along a third axis [typically Z]; the CNC control model must be one that supports using the third axis) or a simulation of it using extremely small increments of 3-axes linear interpolation (which is not practical to program manually but can be programmed easily with CAD/CAM software). The cutter geometry reflects the thread pitch but not its lead; the lead (thread helix angle) is determined by the toolpath. Tapered threads can be cut either with a tapered multiple-form cutter that completes the thread in one revolution using helical interpolation, or with a straight or tapered cutter (of single- or multiple-form) whose toolpath is one or more revolutions but cannot use helical interpolation and must use CAD/CAM software to generate a contour-like simulation of helical interpolation.

The tooling used for thread milling can be solid or indexable. For internal threads, solid cutters are generally limited to holes larger than 6 mm (0.24 in), and indexable internal thread cutting tools are limited to holes larger than 12 mm (0.47 in). The advantage is that when the insert wears out it is easily and more cost effectively replaced. The disadvantage is the cycle time is generally longer than solid tools. Note that solid multiple-form thread cutting tools look similar to taps, but they differ in that the cutting tool does not have a backtaper and there is not a lead-in chamfer. This lack of a lead-in chamfer allows the threads to be formed within one pitch length of the bottom of a blind hole.

===== Thrilling =====
Thrilling is the process of threading and drilling (accomplished in the reverse order) internal threads using a specialized cutting tool on a CNC mill. The cutting tool tip is shaped like a drill or center-cutting endmill, while the body has a thread-shaped form with a countersink cutter form near the shank. The cutter first plunges to drill the hole. Then the thread is circularly interpolated just like the multiple-form cutter described above. This tool drills, chamfers, and threads a hole all in one compact cycle. The advantage is this process eliminates a tool, tool-holder, and tool change. The disadvantage is that the process is limited to hole depth no greater than three times the diameter of the tool.

==== Helical broaching (Punch Tap) ====
A method of helical broaching was developed in the 2010s that shortens the toolpath of tapping. To a casual observer (without slow motion), it looks rather similar to traditional tapping but with faster movement into and out of the hole. It uses a specific tool geometry and toolpath to position rapidly, broach the thread in a single half-turn, and then retract rapidly, shortening the cycle time and consuming less energy. It reduces the cost of threading for any holes that can safely allow the two small fast-helix grooves that it leaves behind along with the thread, which could be true in many applications.

=== Thread grinding ===
Thread grinding is done on a grinding machine using specially dressed grinding wheels matching the shape of the threads. The process is usually used to produce accurate threads or threads in hard materials; a common application is ball screw mechanisms. There are three types: center-type grinding with axial feed, center-type infeed thread grinding and centerless thread grinding. Center-type grinding with an axial feed is the most common of the three. It is similar to cutting a thread on a lathe with a single-point cutting tool, except the cutting tool is replaced with a grinding wheel. Usually a single ribbed wheel is used, although multiple ribbed wheels are also available. To complete the thread multiple passes are commonly required. Center-type infeed thread grinding use a grinding wheel with multiple ribs that is longer than the length of the desired thread. First, the grinding wheel is fed into the blank to the full thread depth. Then the blank is slowly rotated through approximately 1.5 turns while axially advancing through one pitch per revolution. Finally, the centerless thread grinding process is used to make head-less set screws in a similar method as centerless grinding. The blanks are hopper-fed to the grinding wheels, where the thread is fully formed. Common centerless thread grinding production rates are 60 to 70 pieces per minute for a 0.5 in (13 mm) long set screw.

=== Thread lapping ===
Rarely, thread cutting or grinding (usually the latter) will be followed by thread lapping in order to achieve the highest precision and surface finish achievable. This is a toolroom practice when the highest precision is required, rarely employed except for the leadscrews or ballscrews of high-end machine tools.

=== Threading with EDM ===
Internal threads can be electrical discharge machined (EDM) into hard materials using a sinker style machine.

== Deformative or transformative methods ==
=== Thread forming and rolling ===
The thread forming and rolling concept

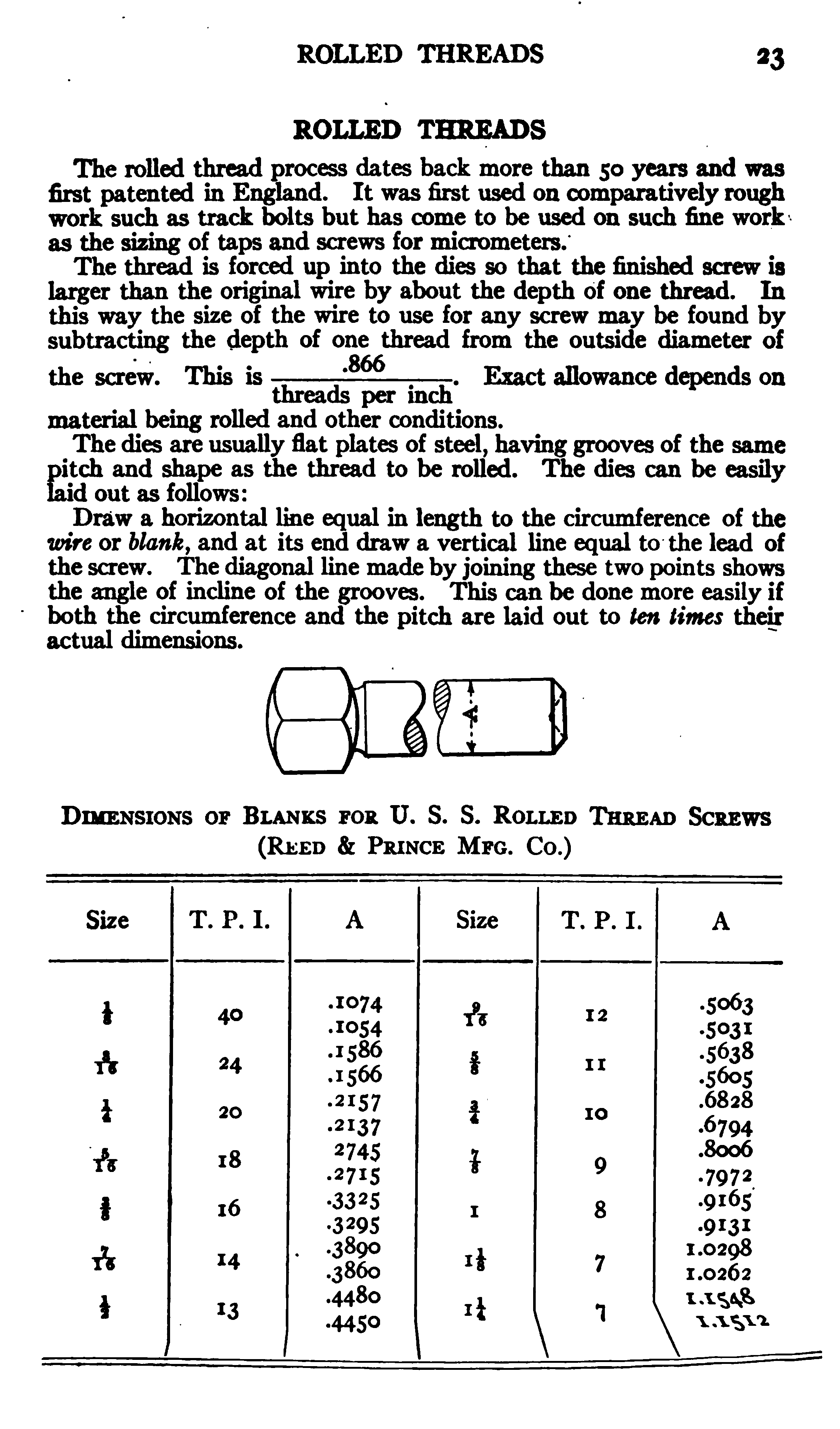
Page 23 of Colvin FH, Stanley FA (eds) (1914): American Machinists' Handbook, 2nd ed. New York and London: McGraw-Hill. Summarizes screw thread rolling practice as of 1914.

Thread forming and thread rolling are processes for forming, rather than cutting, screw threads, with the former referring to creating internal threads and the latter external threads. In both of these processes threads are formed into a blank by pressing a shaped tool, commonly called a 'thread rolling die' against the blank, in a process similar to knurling. These processes are used for large production runs because typical production rates are around one piece per second. Forming and rolling produce no swarf and less material is required because the blank size starts smaller than a blank required for cutting threads; there is typically a 15 to 20% material savings in the blank, by weight. A rolled thread can be easily recognized on fasteners that were formed from an unstopped blank because the thread has a larger diameter than the blank rod from which it has been made; however, necks and undercuts can be cut or rolled onto blanks with threads that are not rolled, and some fasteners are made from blanks with a reduced shank in the region to be rolled to maintain a constant major diameter from thread to unthreaded shank. Unless faced off, the end threads of a rolled fastener have a cupped end, as the surplus material in the tapering down final threads collapses uniformly over the end of the blank.

Materials are limited to ductile materials because the threads are cold formed. However, this increases the thread's yield strength, surface finish, hardness, wear resistance, and fatigue strength due to conformance of the grain with the thread profile. Also, materials with good deformation characteristics are necessary for rolling; these materials include softer (more ductile) metals and exclude brittle materials, such as cast iron. Tolerances are typically ±0.001 in. (±0.025 mm), but tolerances as tight as ±0.0006 in (±0.015 mm) are achievable. Surface finishes range from 6 to 32 micro-inches.

There are four main types of thread rolling, named after the configuration of the dies: flat dies, two-die cylindrical, three-die cylindrical, and planetary dies. The flat die system has two flat dies. The bottom one is held stationary and the other slides. The blank is placed on one end of the stationary die and then the moving die slides over the blank, which causes the blank to roll between the two dies forming the threads. Before the moving die reaches the end of its stroke the blank rolls off the stationary die in a finished form. The two-die cylindrical process is used to produce threads up to 6 in (150 mm) in diameter and 20 in (510 mm) in length. There are two types of three-die processes; the first has the three dies move radially out from the center to let the blank enter the dies and then closes and rotates to roll the threads. This type of process is commonly employed on turret lathes and screw machines. The second type takes the form of a self-opening die head. This type is more common than the former, but is limited by not being able to form the last 1.5 to 2 threads against shoulders. Planetary dies are used to mass-produce threads up to 1 in (25 mm) in diameter.

Thread forming is performed using a fluteless tap, or roll tap, which closely resembles a cutting tap without the flutes. There are lobes periodically spaced around the tap that actually do the thread forming as the tap is advanced into a properly sized hole. Since the tap does not produce chips, there is no need to periodically back out the tap to clear away chips, which, in a cutting tap, can jam and break the tap. Thus thread forming is particularly suited to tapping blind holes, which are tougher to tap with a cutting tap due to the chip build-up in the hole. Note that the tap drill size differs from that used for a cutting tap and that an accurate hole size is required because a slightly undersized hole can break the tap. Proper lubrication is essential because of the frictional forces involved, therefore a lubricating oil is used instead of cutting oil.

When considering the blank diameter tolerance, a change in blank diameter will affect the major diameter by an approximate ratio of 3 to 1. Production rates are usually three to five times faster than thread cutting.

Tool styles
Image	Description	Application
Flat die thread rolling	Flat dies (flat roller)	Machine, tapping and wood screws
Two-die cylindrical rolling	Cylindrical in-feed 2 dies	Large or balanced screws, threaded bar stock
Three-die cylindrical rolling	Cylindrical in-feed 3 dies	Tube fitting, spark plugs, threaded bar stock
Planetary thread rolling	Planetary dies (planetary roller)	High volumes screws, sheet metal screws, and drive screws

Production rates
Thread diameter [in.]	Flat dies [pieces/min]	Cylindrical [pieces/min]	Planetary [pieces/min]
1/8	40 to 500	75 to 300	450 to 2000
1/4	40 to 400	60 to 150	250 to 1200
1/2	25 to 90	50 to 100	100 to 400
3/4	20 to 60	5 to 10	-
1	15 to 50	1 to 50	-

=== Thread casting and molding ===
In casting and molding the threads are directly formed by the geometry of the mold cavity in the mold or die. When the material freezes in the mold, it retains the shape after the mold is removed. The material is heated to a liquid, or mixed with a liquid that will either dry or cure (such as plaster or cement). Alternatively, the material may be forced into a mold as a powder and compressed into a solid, as with graphite.

Although the first thoughts that come to mind for most machinists regarding threading are of thread cutting processes (such as tapping, single-pointing, or helical milling), Smid points out that, when plastic bottles for food, beverages, personal care products, and other consumer products are considered, it is actually plastic molding that is the principal method (by sheer volume) of thread generation in manufacturing today. Of course, this fact highlights the importance of the moldmakers getting the mold just right (in preparation for millions of cycles, usually at high speed).

Cast threads in metal parts may be finished by machining, or may be left in the as-cast state. (The same can be said of cast gear teeth.) Whether or not to bother with the additional expense of a machining operation depends on the application. For parts where the extra precision and surface finish is not strictly necessary, the machining is forgone in order to achieve a lower cost. With sand casting parts this means a rather rough finish; but with molded plastic or die-cast metal, the threads can be very nice indeed straight from the mold or die. A common example of molded plastic threads is on soda (pop) bottles. A common example of die-cast threads is on cable glands (connectors/fittings).

== Additive methods ==
Many, perhaps most, threaded parts have potential to be generated via additive manufacturing (3D printing), of which there are many variants, including fused deposition modeling, selective laser sintering, direct metal laser sintering, selective laser melting, electron beam melting, layered object manufacturing, and stereolithography. For most additive technologies, it has not been long since they emerged from the laboratory end of their historical development, but further commercialization is picking up speed. To date, most additive methods tend to produce a rough surface finish and tend to be restricted in the material properties that they can produce, and thus their earliest commercial victories have been in parts for which those restrictions were acceptable. However, the capabilities are continually growing.

Good examples of threaded parts produced with additive manufacturing are found in the dental implant and bone screw fields, where selective laser sintering and selective laser melting have produced threaded titanium implants.

== Combinations of subtractive, additive, deformative, or transformative methods ==
Often subtractive, additive, deformative, or transformative methods are combined in whatever ways are advantageous. Such multidisciplinary manufacturing falls under classifications including rapid prototyping, desktop manufacturing, direct manufacturing, direct digital manufacturing, digital fabrication, instant manufacturing, or on-demand manufacturing.

== Inspection ==
Inspection of the finished screw threads can be achieved in various ways, with the expense of the method tailored to the requirements of the product application. Shop-floor inspection of a thread is often as simple as running a nut onto it (for male threads) or a bolt into it (for female threads). This is plenty good enough for many applications (e.g., MRO or hobbyist work), although it is not good enough for most commercial manufacturing. Higher-precision methods are discussed below.

Commercial-grade inspection of screw threads can involve most of the same inspection methods and tools used to inspect other manufactured products, such as micrometers; vernier or dial calipers; surface plates and height gauges; gauge blocks; optical comparators; white light scanners; and coordinate-measuring machines (CMMs). Even industrial radiography (including industrial CT scanning) can be used, for example, to inspect internal thread geometry in the way that an optical comparator can inspect external thread geometry.

Conical micrometer anvils, specifically suited to resting on the sides of the thread, are made for various thread angles, with 60° being the most common. Mics with such anvils are usually called "thread mics" or "pitch mics" (because they directly measure the pitch diameter). Users who lack thread mics rely instead on the "3-wire method", which involves placing 3 short pieces of wire (or gauge pins) of known diameter into the valleys of the thread and then measuring from wire to wire with standard (flat) anvils. A conversion factor (produced by a straightforward trigonometric calculation) is then multiplied with the measured value to infer a measurement of the thread's pitch diameter. Tables of these conversion factors were established many decades ago for all standard thread sizes, so today a user need only take the measurement and then perform the table lookup (as opposed to recalculating each time). The 3-wire method is also used when high precision is needed to inspect a specific diameter, commonly the pitch diameter, or on specialty threads such as multi-start or when the thread angle is not 60°. Ball-shaped micrometer anvils can be used in similar fashion (same trigonometric relationship, less cumbersome to use). Digital calipers and micrometers can send each measurement (data point) as it occurs to storage or software through an interface (such as USB or RS-232), in which case the table lookup is done in an automated way, and quality assurance and quality control can be achieved using statistical process control.

== History ==
Each method of thread generation has its own detailed history. Therefore, a comprehensive discussion is beyond the scope of this article; but much historical information is available in related articles, including:

- Screw > History
- Screw-cutting lathe > History
- Automatic lathe > History
- Screw thread > History of standardization
- Turret lathe [various sections]
- Casting (metalworking) and its family of articles (e.g., Sand casting > History)
- Grinding (abrasive cutting) and its family of articles
- Additive manufacturing > Historical development and broadening applications
- Various specific additive manufacturing articles (e.g., digital fabricator, direct digital manufacturing, 3D printing, rapid prototyping, solid freeform fabrication)
- List of emerging technologies

=== Cold-rolling ===
The first patent for the cold rolling of screw threads was issued in 1836 to William Keane of Monroe, N.Y. However, the dies for rolling the threads onto the screw blanks were made of cast iron, which is brittle, so the machine was not successful. The process languished until 1867, when Harvey J. Harwood of Utica, New York filed a patent for the cold-rolling of threads on wood screws. Further efforts to cold-roll threads on screws followed, but none seemed to meet with much success until Hayward Augustus Harvey (1824–1893) of Orange, N.J. filed his patents of 1880 and 1881. Charles D. Rogers of the American Screw Co. of Providence, Rhode Island made further refinements to the process of rolling threads onto screws.
