= Screw machine =

A screw machine may refer to a:

- Screw machine (automatic lathe), a small- to medium-sized automatic lathe that is mechanically automated via cams
- Screw machine (turning center), a small- to medium-sized turning center that is electronically automated via CNC
- Screw-cutting lathe
- Turret lathe, now rarely called screw machines
