= Screw-cutting lathe =

Machine for accurately cutting screw threads

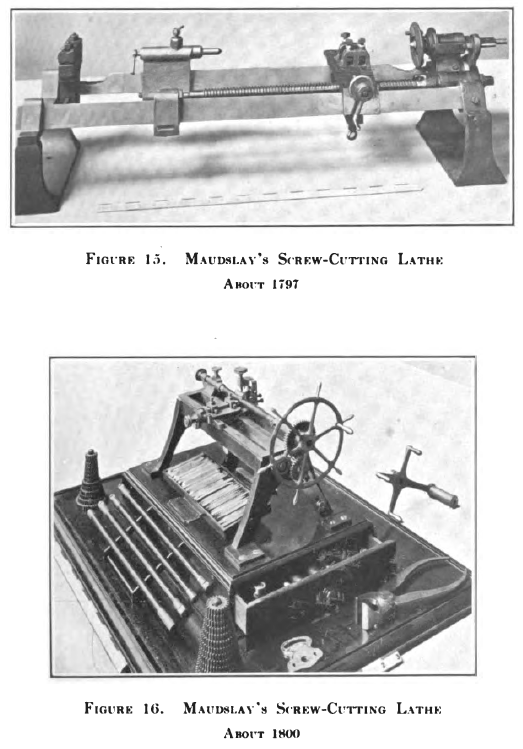
Henry Maudslay's early screw-cutting lathes of circa 1797 and 1800.

A screw-cutting lathe is a machine (specifically, a lathe) capable of cutting very accurate screw threads via single-point screw-cutting, which is the process of guiding the linear motion of the tool bit in a precisely known ratio to the rotating motion of the workpiece. This is accomplished by gearing the leadscrew (which drives the tool bit's movement) to the spindle with a certain gear ratio for each thread pitch. Every degree of spindle rotation is matched by a certain distance of linear tool travel, depending on the desired thread pitch (English or metric, fine or coarse, etc.).

The name "screw-cutting lathe" carries a taxonomic qualification on its use—it is a term of historical classification rather than one of current commercial machine tool terminology. Early lathes, many centuries ago, were not adapted to screw-cutting. Later, from the Late Middle Ages until the early nineteenth century, some lathes were distinguishable as "screw-cutting lathes" because of the screw-cutting ability specially built into them. Since then, most metalworking lathes have this ability built in, but they are not called "screw-cutting lathes" in modern taxonomy.

== History ==
The screw has been known for thousands of years. Archimedes described the water screw, a system for raising water. Screws as mechanical fasteners date to the first century BC. Although screws were tremendously useful, the difficulty in making them prevented any widespread adoption. The designers of screw-cutting lathes aimed to solve this problem with their machines in such a manner that would enable the production of screws cheaply and efficiently. It would be these qualities of screw production that enabled the utilization of screws in an industrializing world.

=== Early wooden screws ===
The earliest screws tended to be made of wood, and they were whittled by hand, with or without the help of turning on a lathe with hand-controlled turning tools (chisels, knives, gouges), as accurately as the whittler could manage. It is likely that sometimes the wood blanks that they started from were tree branches (or juvenile trunks) that had been shaped by a vine wrapped helically around them while they grew. (In fact, various Romance words for "screw" come from the word root referring to vines.) Walking sticks twisted by vines show how suggestive such sticks are of a screw.

=== Early metal screws ===
Early machine screws of metal, and early wood screws [screws made of metal for use in wood], were made by hand, with files used to cut the threads. One method for making fairly accurate threads was to score a rod using an inclined knife with a wrap halfway around the rod, the knife being precisely angled for the proper pitch. This was one of the methods Maudslay used to make his early leadscrews. This made the screw slow and expensive to make, and its quality highly dependent on the skill of the maker. A process for automating the manufacture of screws and improving the accuracy and consistency of the thread was needed.

=== Earliest lathes with machine-guided toolpath for screw-cutting ===
Lathes have been around since ancient times. Adapting them to screw-cutting is an obvious choice, but the problem of how to guide the cutting tool through the correct path was an obstacle for many centuries. Not until the late Middle Ages and early modern period did breakthroughs occur in this area; the earliest of which evidence exists today happened in the 15th century and is documented in the Mittelalterliche Hausbuch. It incorporates slide rests and a leadscrew. Roughly contemporarily, Leonardo da Vinci drew sketches showing various screw-cutting lathes and machines, one with two leadscrews. Leonardo also shows change-gears in some of these sketches.

In the succeeding three centuries, many other designs followed, especially among ornamental turners and clockmakers. These included various important concepts and impressive cleverness, but few were significantly accurate and practical to use. For example, Woodbury discusses Jacques Besson and others. They made impressive contributions to turning, but the context in which they tended to work (turning as a fine art for rich people) did not channel their contributions toward industrial uses.

Henry Hindley designed and constructed a screw-cutting lathe circa 1739. It featured a plate guiding the tool and power supplied by a hand-cranked series of gears. By changing the gears, he could cut screws with different pitch. Removing a gear permitted him to make left-handed threads.

=== Modern screw-cutting lathes (late 18th to early 19th centuries) ===
The first truly modern screw-cutting lathe was likely constructed by Jesse Ramsden in 1775. His device included a leadscrew, slide rest, and change gear mechanism. These form the elements of a modern (non-CNC) lathe and are in use to this day. Ramsden was able to use his first screw-cutting lathe to make even more accurate lathes. With these, he was able to make an exceptionally accurate dividing engine and in turn, some of the finest astronomical, surveying, and navigational instruments of the 18th century.

Others followed. Examples were a French mechanic surnamed Senot, who in 1795 created a screw-cutting lathe capable of industrial-level production, and David Wilkinson of Rhode Island, who employed a slide rest in 1798. However, these inventors were soon overshadowed by Henry Maudslay, who in 1800 created what is frequently cited as the first industrially practical screw-cutting lathe. According to Encyclopaedia Britannica, “The outstanding feature of Maudslay’s lathe was a lead screw for driving the carriage. Geared to the spindle of the lathe, the lead screw advanced the tool at a constant rate of speed and guaranteed accurate screw threads”. Bryan Donkin in 1826 took Maudsleys design and refined it further with his screw cutting and dividing engine lathe, which utilized a mechanism for compensating for inaccuracies in the leadscrew. Joseph Whitworth, a disciple of Maudslay, created a design that, through its adoption by many British railway companies, became a standard for the United Kingdom and the British Empire. Called British Standard Whitworth (BSW), it is the world's first national screw thread standard. These tools were also exported to continental Europe and the United States. They permitted the large-scale, industrial production of screws that were interchangeable. Standardization of threadforms (including thread angle, pitches, major diameters, pitch diameters, etc.) began immediately on the intra-company level, and by the end of the 19th century, it had been carried to the international level (although pluralities of standards still exist).

In the late 19th century Henry Augustus Rowland found a need for very high precision screws in cutting diffraction gratings, so he developed a technique for making them.

== Present day ==
Until the early 19th century, the notion of a screw-cutting lathe stood in contrast to the notion of a plain lathe, which lacked the parts needed to guide the cutting tool in the precise path needed to produce an accurate thread. Since the early 19th century, it has been common practice to build these parts into any general-purpose metalworking lathe; thus, the distinction between "plain lathe" and "screw-cutting lathe" does not apply to the classification of modern lathes. Instead, there are other categories, some of which bundle single-point screw-cutting capability among other capabilities (for example, regular lathes, toolroom lathes, and CNC lathes), and some of which omit single-point screw-cutting capability as irrelevant to the machines' intended purposes (for example, speed lathes and turret lathes).

Today the threads of threaded fasteners (such as machine screws, wood screws, wallboard screws, and sheetmetal screws) are usually not cut via single-point screw-cutting; instead most are generated by other, faster processes, such as thread forming and rolling and cutting with die heads. The latter processes are the ones employed in modern screw machines. These machines, although they are lathes specialized for making screws, are not screw-cutting lathes in the sense of employing single-point screw-cutting.

== See also ==
- Lathe
- Lathe (metal)
- Screw machine

== Bibliography ==
- Brachet, Auguste (1878), An etymological dictionary of the French language (2nd ed.), Oxford, England: Clarendon Press, LCCN 10005541, [3rd ed, 1882].
- Roe, Joseph Wickham (1916), English and American Tool Builders, New Haven, Connecticut: Yale University Press, LCCN 16011753. Reprinted by McGraw-Hill, New York and London, 1926 (LCCN 27-24075); and by Lindsay Publications, Inc., Bradley, Illinois (ISBN 978-0-917914-73-7).
- Woodbury, Robert S. (1972) [1961], History of the Lathe to 1850. In Studies in the History of Machine Tools, Cambridge, Massachusetts, USA, and London, England: MIT Press, ISBN 978-0-262-73033-4, LCCN 72006354. First published as a monograph in 1961. Series of monographs republished in one volume in 1972. A collection of seminal classics of machine tool history.
