= Spindle (tool) =

Rotary unit of a machine tool

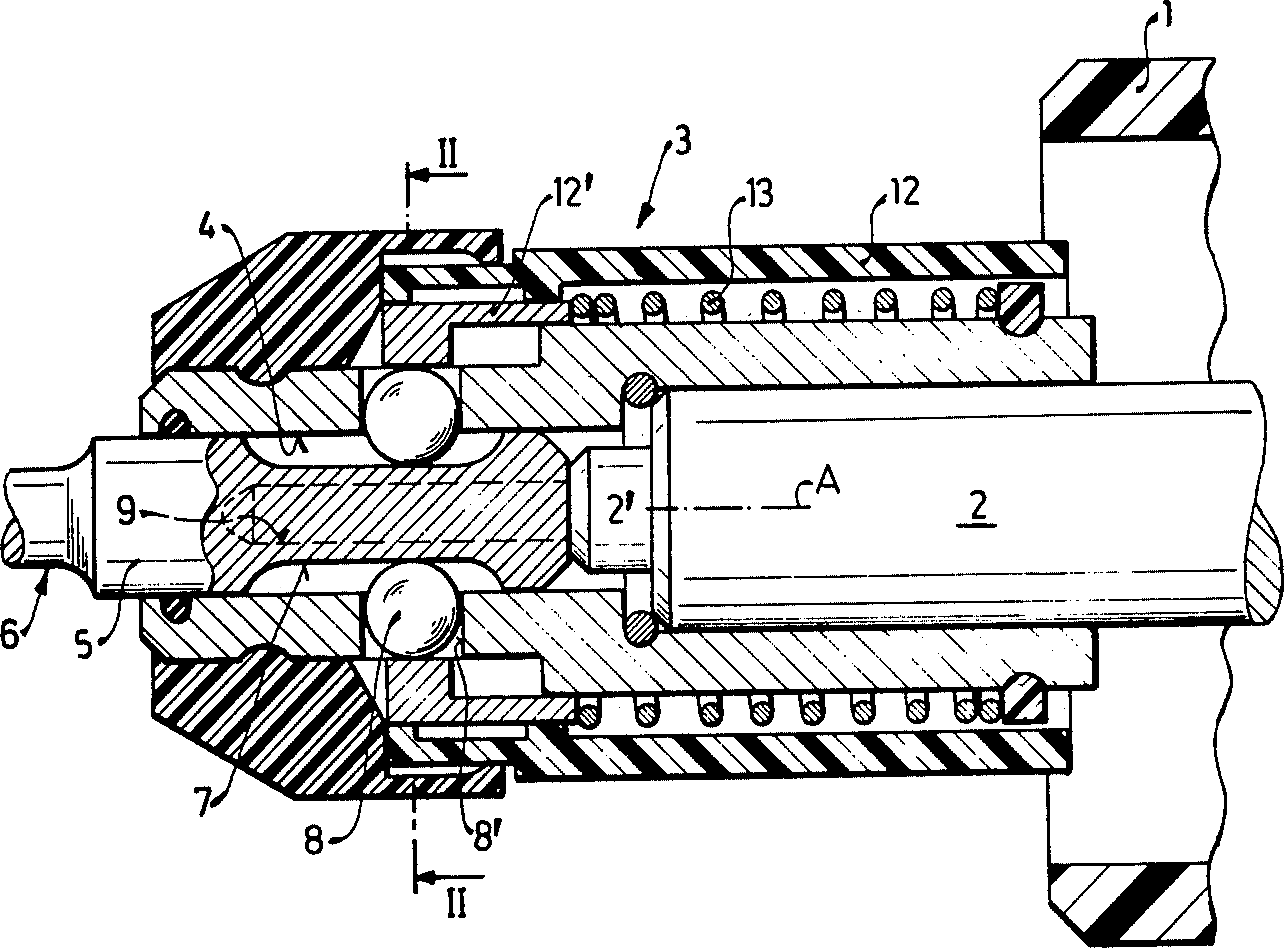
Chuck connecting a drill bit to the spindle

In machine tools, a spindle is a rotating axis of the machine, which often has a shaft at its center. The shaft itself is called a spindle, but also, in shop-floor practice, the word often is used metonymically to refer to the entire rotary unit, including not only the shaft itself, but its bearings and anything attached to it (chuck, etc.). Spindles are electrically or pneumatically powered and come in various sizes. They are versatile in terms of material it can work with. Materials that spindles work with include embroidery, foam, glass, wood, etc.

A machine tool may have several spindles, such as the headstock and tailstock spindles on a bench lathe. The main spindle is usually the biggest one. References to "the spindle" without further qualification imply the main spindle. Some machine tools that specialize in high-volume mass production have a group of 4, 6, or even more main spindles. These are called multispindle machines. For example, gang drills and many screw machines are multispindle machines. Although a bench lathe has more than one spindle (counting the tailstock), it is not called a multispindle machine; it has one main spindle.

Examples of spindles include

- On a lathe (whether wood lathe or metal lathe), the spindle is the heart of the headstock.
- In rotating-cutter woodworking machinery, the spindle is the part on which shaped milling cutters are mounted for cutting features (such as rebates, beads, and curves) into mouldings and similar millwork.
- Similarly, in rotating-cutter metalworking machine tools (such as milling machines and drill presses), the spindle is the shaft to which the tool (such as a drill bit or milling cutter) is attached (for example, via a chuck).
- Varieties of spindles include grinding spindles, electric spindles, machine tool spindles, low-speed spindles, high speed spindles, and more.
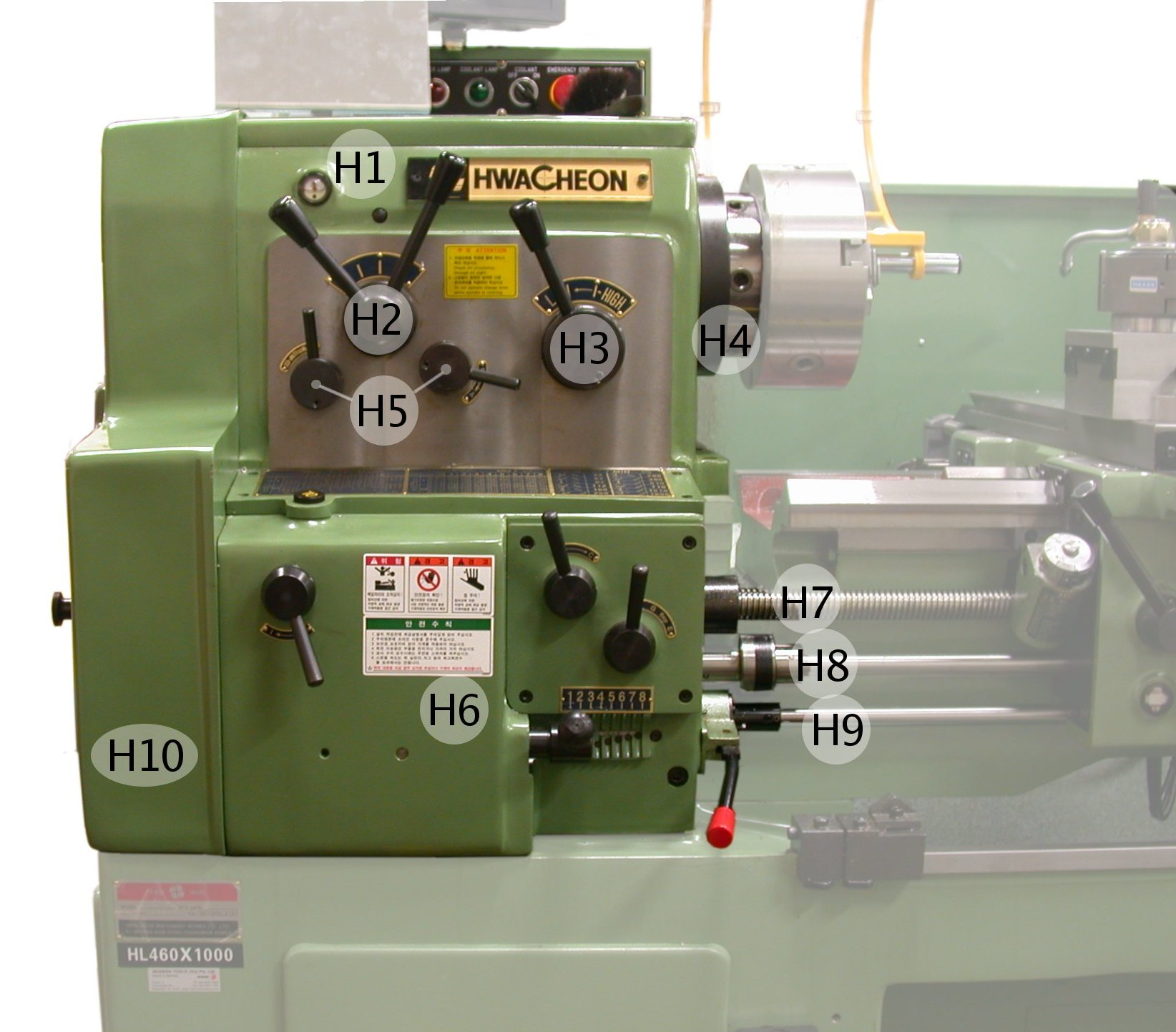
Lathe headstock: H4 - Spindle

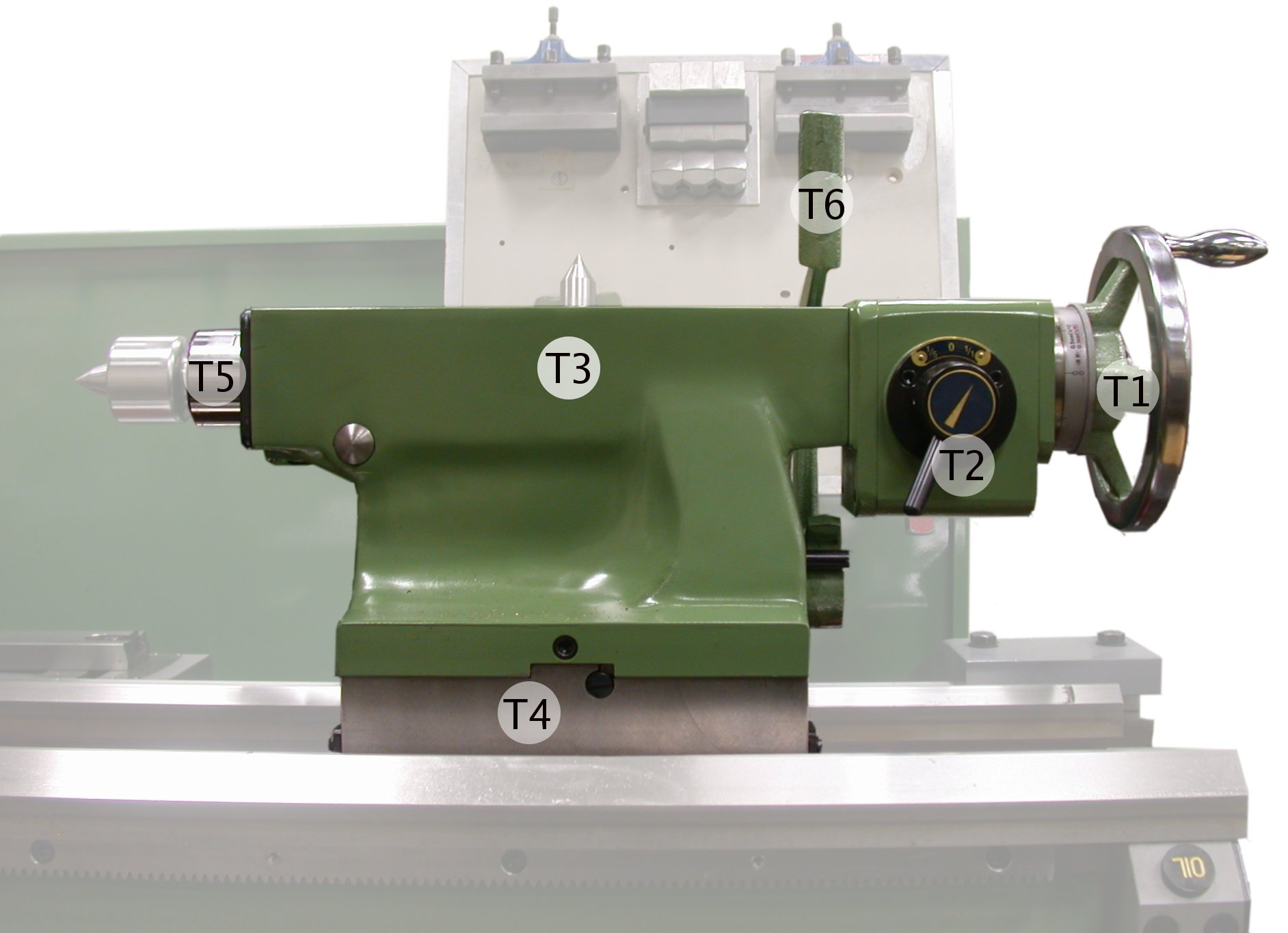
Lathe tailstock: T5 - Spindle

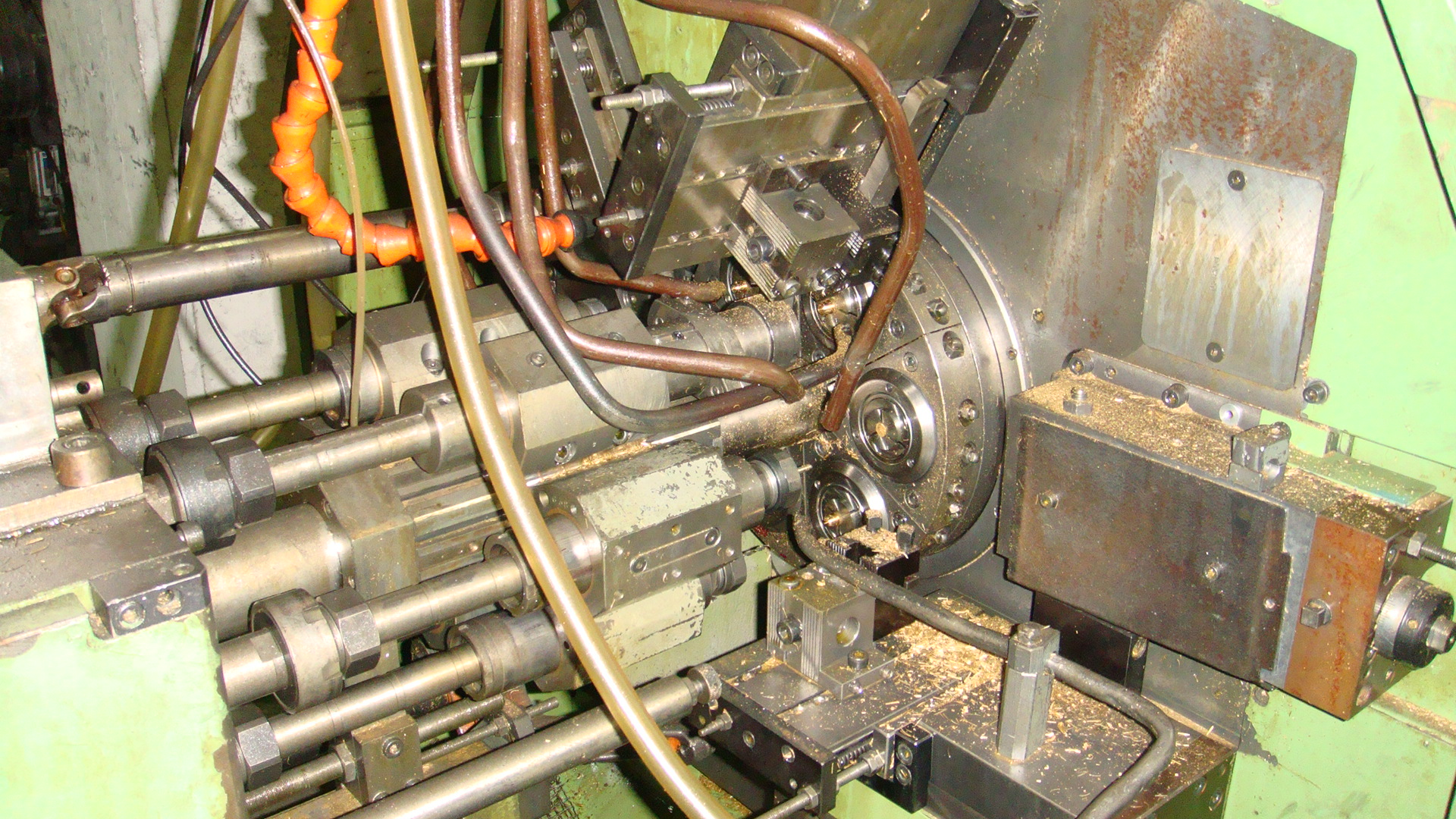
Multi spindle lathe

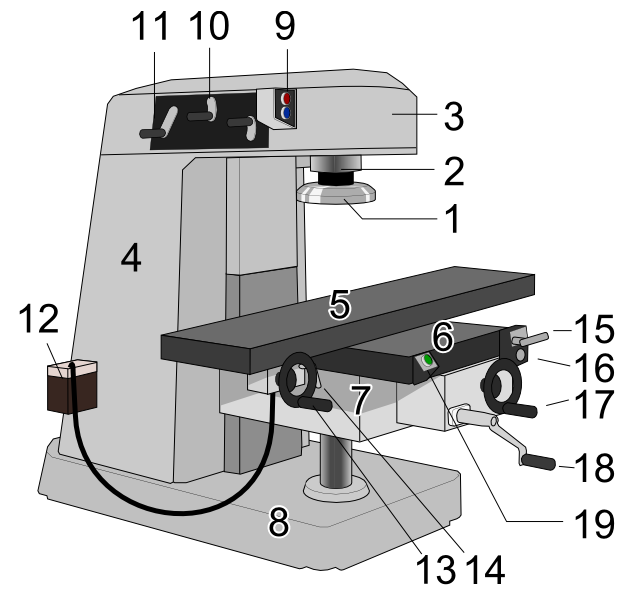
Vertical milling machine (single spindle): #2 - Spindle

== High speed spindle ==
High speed spindles are used strictly in machines, like CNC mills, designed for metal work.There are two types of high speed spindles, each with different designs:

=== Belt-driven spindle ===
Consisting of spindle and bearing shafts held within the spindle housing, the belt-driven spindle is powered by an external motor connected via a belt-pulley system.

- External motor: Can be changed to create higher power and torque
- Max speeds: 12,000-15,000 RPM
- Advantage: Cost-effective
- Disadvantage: Limited max speed limits applications (high speeds cause quick burnout, different housing limit power and torque)

=== Integral motor spindle ===
A main component of this spindle is the motor, stored internally.

- Internal motor: Limited power and torque due to restricted space within the spindle housing
- Speed range: 20,000-60,000 RPM (top speed according to design)
- Advantage: High top speed expands application use
- Disadvantage: Sensitive life range according to use

Both types, the belt-driven and the integral motor spindles, have advantages and disadvantages according to their design. Which one is more desirable depends on the purpose of the machine and product(s) being produced.

=== CNC machines used with spindles ===
The type of computer numerical control (CNC) machine being used with your spindle will vary. Common CNC machines used are:

- CNC milling machines
- CNC lathes
- CNC plasma cutter
- Electrical discharge machining (EDM)
- CNC water jet cutters
