= Die head =

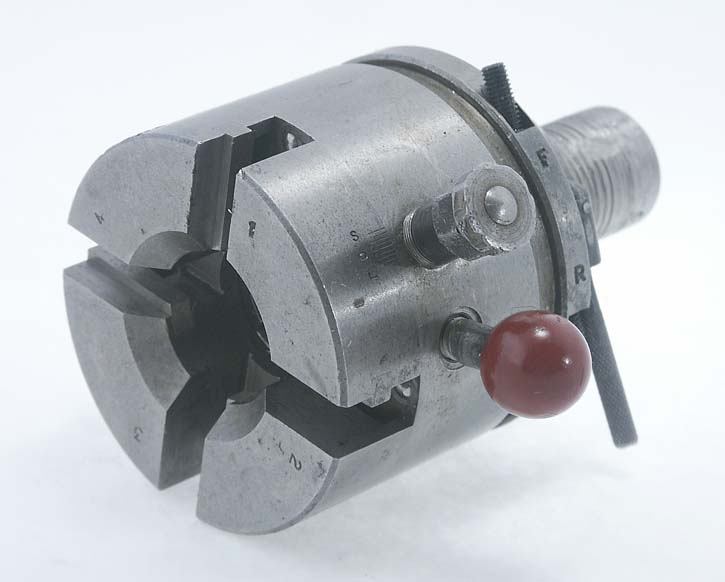
Die Head

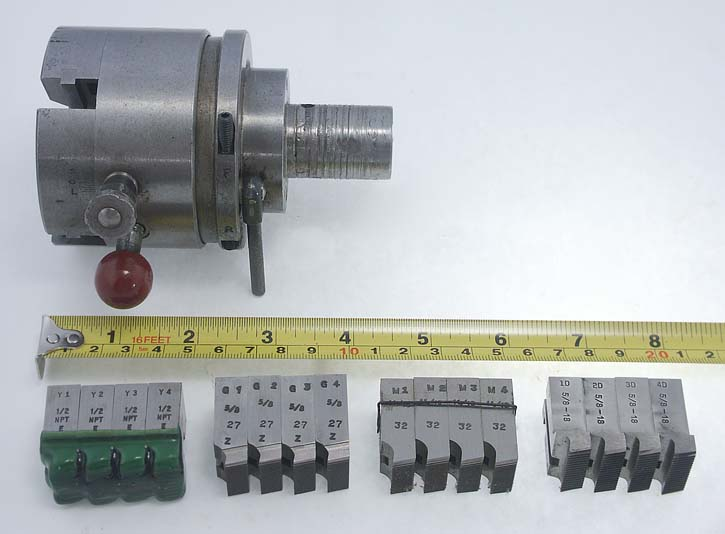
Die Head with various chasers

A die head is a threading die that is used in the high volume production of threaded fasteners.

Die heads are commonly used on lathes, turret lathes, screw machines and CNC lathes. They may be used for either cutting a thread or rolling a thread. They may also be used for internal or external thread cutting.

In operation, there are usually four moveable chasers that cut the thread then back away from the work to permit rapid removal of the tool. The lower picture at the right shows four sets of chasers. Each set of chasers is designed to cut a different thread. One set of chasers would be used at a time, each chaser is inserted into the die head (in the correct order) and the die head is closed bringing the chasers down to their cutting position. When sufficient length of thread has been cut the die head will open allowing for rapid retraction of the head without interference with the newly formed thread.

The die head shown cuts an outside thread. There are also collapsible die heads that are used to cut an internal thread.

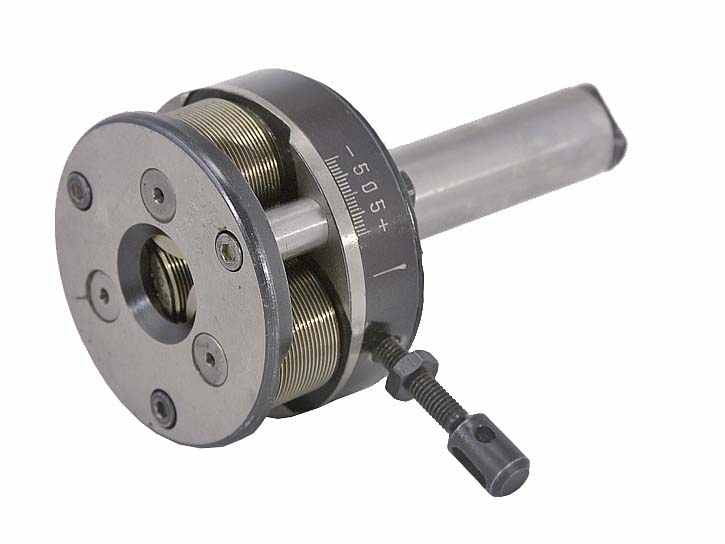
Die Head for Thread Rolling

The bottom picture shows a Die Head used for Thread Rolling. A Rolled Thread may have greater strength than a cut thread, though it usually requires more energy to roll a thread than cut one.
