= Lathe center =

Tool used in machining operations

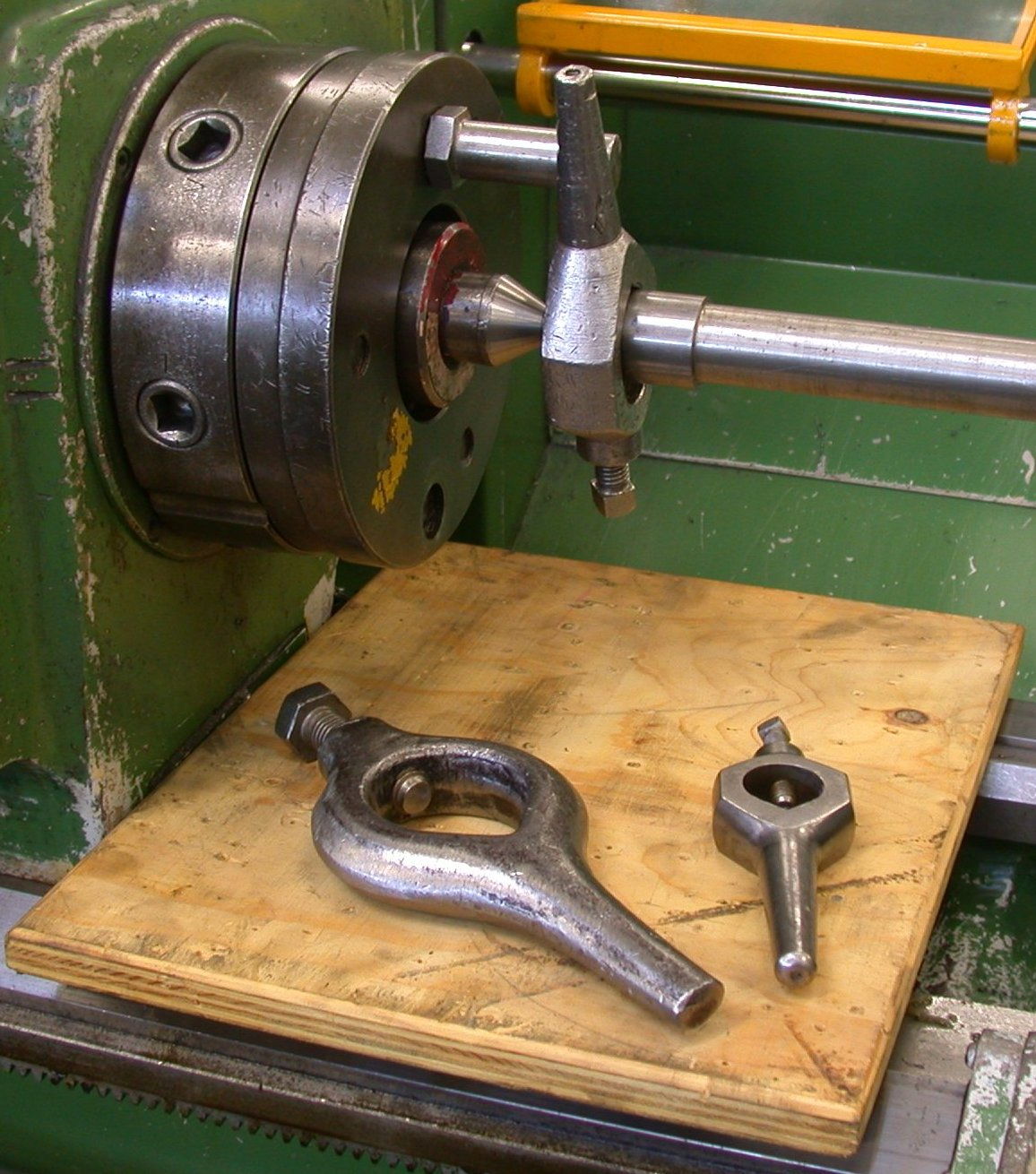
Dead center (the conical piece) mounted in the spindle of a lathe and being used to support a workpiece being driven by a carrier setup

A lathe center, often shortened to center, is a tool that has been ground to a point to accurately position a workpiece on an axis. They usually have an included angle of 60°, but in heavy machining situations an angle of 75° is used.

The primary use of a center is to ensure concentric work is produced; this allows the workpiece to be transferred between machining (or inspection) operations without any loss of accuracy. A part may be turned in a lathe, sent off for hardening and tempering and then ground between centers in a cylindrical grinder. The preservation of concentricity between the turning and grinding operations is crucial for quality work.

When turning between centers, a steady rest can be used to support longer workpieces where the cutting forces would deflect the work excessively, reducing the finish and accuracy of the workpiece, or creating a hazardous situation.

A lathe center has applications anywhere that a centered workpiece may be used; this is not limited to lathe usage but may include setups in dividing heads, cylindrical grinders, tool and cutter grinders or other related equipment. The term between centers refers to any machining operation where the job needs to be performed using centers.

A center is inserted into a matching hole drilled by a center drill. The hole is conical near the surface and cylindrical as it gets deeper.

== Dead center (and live center) ==
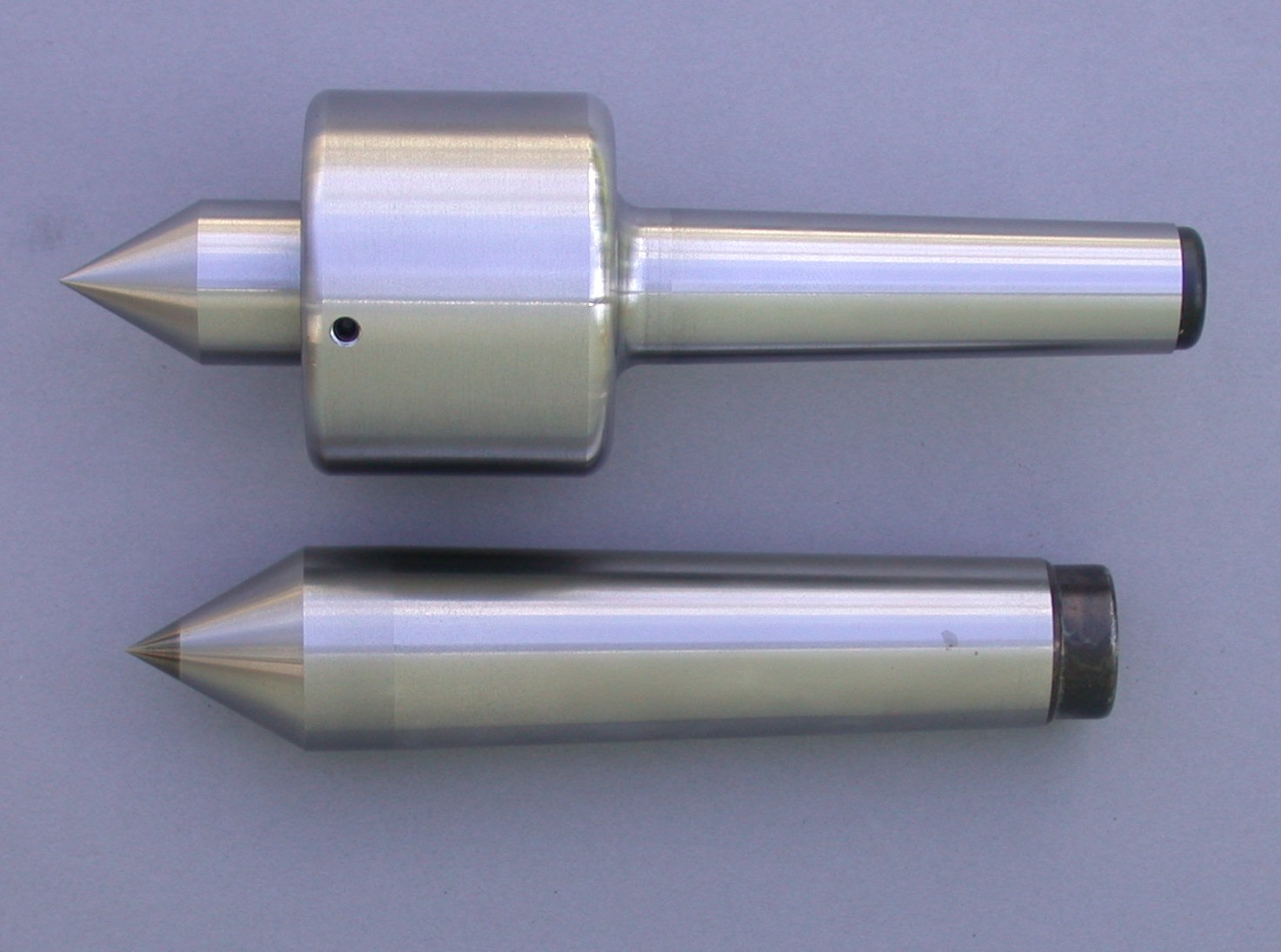
Revolving (live) center (top) Dead center with carbide insert (bottom)

A dead center (one that does not turn freely, i.e., dead) may be used to support the workpiece at either the fixed or rotating end of the machine. When used in the fixed position, a dead center produces friction between the workpiece and center, due to the rotation of the workpiece. Lubrication is therefore required between the center and workpiece to prevent friction welding from occurring. Additionally the tip of the center may have an insert of cemented carbide which will reduce the friction slightly and allow for faster speeds. Dead centers are typically fully hardened to prevent damage to the important mating surfaces of the taper and to preserve the 60° angle of the nose. As tungsten carbide is much harder than steel, a carbide-tipped center has greater wear resistance than a steel center.

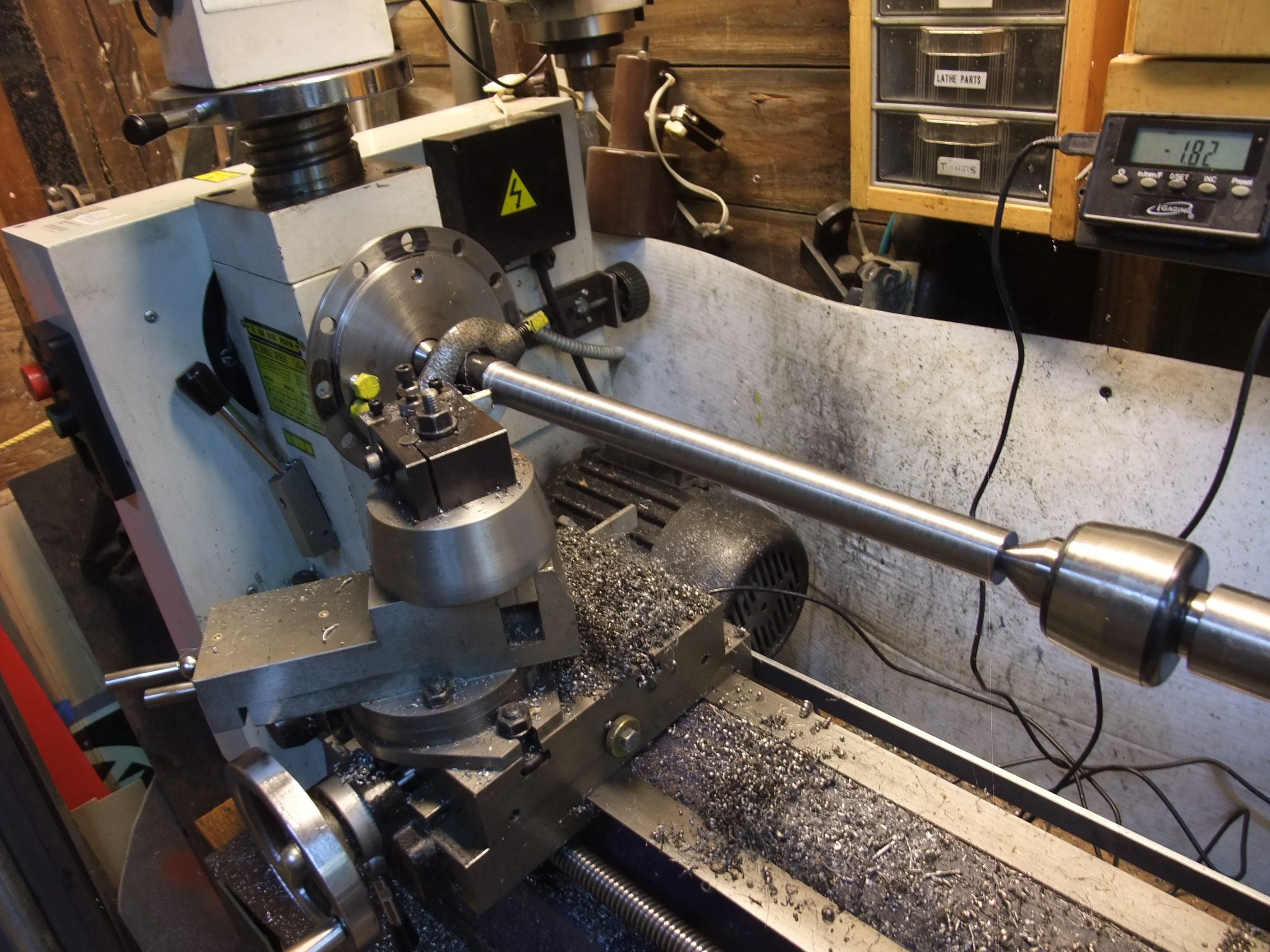
Turning between centres

When turning between centres, a 'dead centre' is used in the headstock as well as the tailstock. As the one in the headstock revolves with the work, this centre is known as a live centre.

== Soft center ==
Soft centers are a special version of the dead center in which the nose is deliberately left soft (unhardened) so that it may be readily machined to the correct angle prior to usage. This operation is performed on the headstock center to ensure that the center's axis is aligned with the spindle's axis.

== Running or revolving center ==
A revolving center, also known as a rotating center or running center in some countries, is constructed so that the 60° center runs in its own bearings and is used at the non-driven or tailstock end of a machine. It allows higher turning speeds without the need for separate lubrication, and also greater clamping pressures. CNC lathes use this type of center almost exclusively and they may be used for general machining operations as well. Spring-loaded centers are designed to compensate for center variations, without damage to the work piece or center tip. This assures the operator of uniform constant tension while machining. Some live centers also have interchangeable shafts. This is valuable when situations require a design other than a 60° male tip. A live center, which may be hard or soft, is a plain center placed in the revolving mandrel; it moves and is therefore live.

== Pipe center ==
A pipe center, also known as a bull nose center, is a type of live center which has a large diameter conical nose rather than a sharp point. This allows the center to be used in the bore of a pipe or other workpiece with a large interior diameter. While a pipe center ensures the workpiece remains concentric, its main advantage is that it supports the workpiece securely, and can be used for parts whose larger inner diameter prevents the use of a normal pointed center. Thin-walled material such as pipes easily collapses if excessive force is used at the chuck end.

== Cup center ==
There are two types of cup centers. The woodworking variety is a variation of the traditional live center. This type of cup center has a central point like a normal live center and also has a ring surrounding it. The ring supports the softer material around the center point and prevents the wood from splitting under pressure from the central point. A different variety of cup center is used for metalworking. The metalworking variety of cup center has a tapered hole rather than a conical point. It supports the part by making contact with the outside diameter of the end of the part, rather than using a center hole.

== Drive center ==
A drive center, also known as a grip center, is used in the driving end of a machine (headstock). It is often used in woodworking or where softer materials are machined. The biggest advantage is one clamping and can process whole sizes of parts, don't need to reclamp and then save more time.

It consists of a dead center surrounded by hardened teeth, which bite into a softer workpiece allowing the workpiece to be driven directly by the center. This allows the full diameter of the workpiece to be machined in a single operation, in contrast with the usual requirement where a carrier is attached to the workpiece at the driven end. The use of modified shell end mills in a drive center, instead of hardened pins, enables better gripping and prevents breakdown time due to pin stop.

== Spring center ==
A spring center is a metalworking lathe center for maintaining a cutting tool like a reamer or a tap, in axial alignment with a hole being worked on. It consists of a point backed by a spring to push the cutting tool into the workpiece.
