= Engine efficiency =

Work done divided by heat provided

Engine efficiency of thermal engines is the relationship between the total energy contained in the fuel, and the amount of energy used to perform useful work. There are two classifications of thermal engines-

1. Internal combustion (gasoline, diesel and gas turbine-Brayton cycle engines) and
2. External combustion engines (steam piston, steam turbine, and the Stirling cycle engine).

Each of these engines has thermal efficiency characteristics that are unique to it.

Engine efficiency, transmission design, and tire design all contribute to a vehicle's fuel efficiency.

== Mathematical definition ==
The efficiency of an engine is defined as ratio of the useful work done to the heat provided.

$$\eta = \frac{ \mathrm{work\ done} } {\mathrm{heat\ absorbed}} = \frac{ Q_1-Q_2 }{ Q_1}$$

where, $Q_1$ is the heat absorbed and $Q_1-Q_2$ is the work done.

Please note that the term work done relates to the power delivered at the clutch or at the driveshaft.

This means the friction and other losses are subtracted from the work done by thermodynamic expansion. Thus an engine not delivering any work to the outside environment has zero efficiency.

== Compression ratio ==
The efficiency of internal combustion engines depends on several factors, the most important of which is the expansion ratio. For any heat engine the work which can be extracted from it is proportional to the difference between the starting pressure and the ending pressure during the expansion phase. Hence, increasing the starting pressure is an effective way to increase the work extracted (decreasing the ending pressure, as is done with steam turbines by exhausting into a vacuum, is likewise effective).

The compression ratio (calculated purely from the geometry of the mechanical parts) of a typical gasoline (petrol) is 10:1 (premium fuel) or 9:1 (regular fuel), with some engines reaching a ratio of 12:1 or more. The greater the expansion ratio, the more efficient the engine, in principle, and higher compression / expansion -ratio conventional engines in principle need gasoline with higher octane value, though this simplistic analysis is complicated by the difference between actual and geometric compression ratios. High octane value inhibits the fuel's tendency to burn nearly instantaneously (known as detonation or knock) at high compression/high heat conditions. The higher cost of high octane gasoline, however, results in the majority of cars (80%) being designed with lower compression ratios to run on regular gasoline, even at the expense of efficiency. However, in engines that utilize compression rather than spark ignition, by means of very high compression ratios (14–25:1), such as the diesel engine or Bourke engine, high octane fuel is not necessary. In fact, lower-octane fuels, typically rated by cetane number, are preferable in these applications because they are more easily ignited under compression.

Under part throttle conditions (i.e. when the throttle is less than fully open), the effective compression ratio is less than when the engine is operating at full throttle, due to the simple fact that the incoming fuel-air mixture is being restricted and cannot fill the chamber to full atmospheric pressure. The engine efficiency is less than when the engine is operating at full throttle. One solution to this issue is to shift the load in a multi-cylinder engine from some of the cylinders (by deactivating them) to the remaining cylinders so that they may operate under higher individual loads and with correspondingly higher effective compression ratios. This technique is known as variable displacement.

Most petrol (gasoline, Otto cycle) and diesel (Diesel cycle) engines have an expansion ratio equal to the compression ratio. Some engines, which use the Atkinson cycle or the Miller cycle achieve increased efficiency by having an expansion ratio larger than the compression ratio.

Diesel engines have a compression/expansion ratio between 14:1 and 25:1. In this case the general rule of higher efficiency from higher compression does not apply because diesels with compression ratios over 20:1 are indirect injection diesels (as opposed to direct injection). These use a prechamber to make possible the high RPM operation required in automobiles/cars and light trucks. The thermal and gas dynamic losses from the prechamber result in direct injection diesels (despite their lower compression / expansion ratio) being more efficient.

== Friction ==
An engine has many moving parts that produce friction. Some of these friction forces remain constant (as long as the applied load is constant); some of these friction losses increase as engine speed increases, such as piston side forces and connecting bearing forces (due to increased inertia forces from the oscillating piston). A few friction forces decrease at higher speed, such as the friction force on the cam's lobes used to operate the inlet and outlet valves (the valves' inertia at high speed tends to pull the cam follower away from the cam lobe). Along with friction forces, an operating engine has pumping losses, which is the work required to move air into and out of the cylinders. This pumping loss is minimal at low speed, but increases approximately as the square of the speed, until at rated power an engine is using about 20% of total power production to overcome friction and pumping losses.

== Oxygen ==
Air is approximately 21% oxygen. If there is not enough oxygen for proper combustion, the fuel will not burn completely and will produce less energy. An excessively rich fuel to air ratio will increase unburnt hydrocarbon pollutants from the engine. If all of the oxygen is consumed because there is too much fuel, the engine's power is reduced.

As combustion temperature tends to increase with leaner fuel air mixtures, unburnt hydrocarbon pollutants must be balanced against higher levels of pollutants such as nitrogen oxides (NOx), which are created at higher combustion temperatures. This is sometimes mitigated by introducing fuel upstream of the combustion chamber to cool down the incoming air through evaporative cooling. This can increase the total charge entering the cylinder (as cooler air will be more dense), resulting in more power but also higher levels of hydrocarbon pollutants and lower levels of nitrogen oxide pollutants. With direct injection this effect is not as dramatic but it can cool down the combustion chamber enough to reduce certain pollutants such as nitrogen oxides (NOx), while raising others such as partially decomposed hydrocarbons.

The air-fuel mix is drawn into an engine because the downward motion of the pistons induces a partial vacuum. A compressor can additionally be used to force a larger charge (forced induction) into the cylinder to produce more power. The compressor is either mechanically driven supercharging or exhaust driven turbocharging. Either way, forced induction increases the air pressure exterior to the cylinder inlet port.

There are other methods to increase the amount of oxygen available inside the engine; one of them, is to inject nitrous oxide, (N_{2}O) to the mixture, and some engines use nitromethane, a fuel that provides the oxygen itself it needs to burn. Because of that, the mixture could be 1 part of fuel and 3 parts of air; thus, it is possible to burn more fuel inside the engine, and get higher power outputs.

== Internal combustion engines ==
=== Reciprocating engines ===
Reciprocating engines at idle have low thermal efficiency because the only usable work being drawn off the engine is from the generator.

At low speeds, gasoline engines suffer efficiency losses at small throttle openings from the high turbulence and frictional (head) loss when the incoming air must fight its way around the nearly closed throttle (pump loss); diesel engines do not suffer this loss because the incoming air is not throttled, but suffer "compression loss" due to use of the whole charge to compress the air to small amount of power output.

At high speeds, efficiency in both types of engine is reduced by pumping and mechanical frictional losses, and the shorter period within which combustion has to take place. High speeds also results in more drag.

==== Gasoline (petrol) engines ====
Modern gasoline engines have a maximum thermal efficiency of more than 50%, but most road legal cars only achieve about 20% to 40% efficiency. Many engines would be capable of running at higher thermal efficiency but at the cost of higher wear and emissions. In other words, even when the engine is operating at its point of maximum thermal efficiency, of the total heat energy released by the gasoline consumed, about 60-80% of total power is emitted as heat without being turned into useful work, i.e. turning the crankshaft. Approximately half of this rejected heat is carried away by the exhaust gases, and half passes through the cylinder walls or cylinder head into the engine cooling system, and is passed to the atmosphere via the cooling system radiator. Some of the work generated is also lost as friction, noise, air turbulence, and work used to turn engine equipment and appliances such as water and oil pumps and the electrical generator, leaving only about 20-40% of the energy released by the fuel consumed available to move the vehicle.

A gasoline engine burns a mix of gasoline and air, consisting of a range of about twelve to eighteen parts (by weight) of air to one part of fuel (by weight). A mixture with a 14.7:1 air/fuel ratio is stoichiometric, that is when burned, 100% of the fuel and the oxygen are consumed. Mixtures with slightly less fuel, called lean burn are more efficient. The combustion is a reaction which uses the oxygen content of the air to combine with the fuel, which is a mixture of several hydrocarbons, resulting in water vapor, carbon dioxide, and sometimes carbon monoxide and partially burned hydrocarbons. In addition, at high temperatures the oxygen tends to combine with nitrogen, forming oxides of nitrogen (usually referred to as NOx, since the number of oxygen atoms in the compound can vary, thus the "X" subscript). This mixture, along with the unused nitrogen and other trace atmospheric elements, is what is found in the exhaust.

The most efficient cycle is the Atkinson cycle, but most gasoline engine makers use the Otto cycle for higher power and torque. Some engine design, such as Mazda's Skyactiv-G and some hybrid engines designed by Toyota utilize the Atkinson and Otto cycles together with an electric motor/generator and a traction storage battery. The hybrid drivetrain can achieve effective efficiencies of close to 40%.

==== Diesel engines ====
Engines using the Diesel cycle are usually more efficient, although the Diesel cycle itself is less efficient at equal compression ratios. Since diesel engines use much higher compression ratios (the heat of compression is used to ignite the slow-burning diesel fuel), that higher ratio more than compensates for air pumping losses within the engine.

Modern turbo-diesel engines use electronically controlled common-rail fuel injection to increase efficiency. With the help of geometrically variable turbo-charging system (albeit with more maintenance,) this also increases the engines' torque at low engine speeds (1,200–1,800 rpm). Low speed diesel engines like the MAN S80ME-C7 have achieved an overall energy conversion efficiency of 54.4%, which is the highest conversion of fuel into power by any single-cycle internal or external combustion engine. Engines in large diesel trucks, buses, and newer diesel cars can achieve peak efficiencies around 45%.

=== Gas turbine ===
The gas turbine is most efficient at maximum power output in the same way reciprocating engines are most efficient at maximum load. The difference is that at lower rotational speed the pressure of the compressed air drops and thus thermal and fuel efficiency drop dramatically. Efficiency declines steadily with reduced power output and is very poor in the low power range.

General Motors at one time manufactured a bus powered by a gas turbine, but due to the rise of crude oil prices in the 1970s, this concept was abandoned. Rover, Chrysler, and Toyota also built prototypes of turbine-powered cars. Chrysler built a short prototype series of them for real-world evaluation. Driving comfort was good, but overall economy lacked due to the reasons mentioned above. This is also why gas turbines can be used for permanent and peak-power electric plants. In this application they are only run at or close to full power, where they are efficient, or shut down when not needed.

Gas turbines do have an advantage in power density—gas turbines are used as the engines in heavy armored vehicles and armored tanks and in power generators in jet fighters.

One other factor negatively affecting the gas turbine efficiency is the ambient air temperature. With increasing temperature, intake air becomes less dense and therefore the gas turbine experiences power loss proportional to the increase in ambient air temperature.

Latest generation gas turbine engines have achieved an efficiency of 46% in simple cycle and 61% when used in combined cycle.

== External combustion engines ==
=== Steam engine ===
See also: Steam engine#Efficiency
See also: Timeline of steam power

==== Piston engine ====
Steam engines and turbines operate on the Rankine cycle which has a maximum Carnot efficiency of 63% for practical engines, with steam turbine power plants able to achieve efficiency in the mid 40% range.

The efficiency of steam engines is primarily related to the steam temperature and pressure and the number of stages or expansions. Steam engine efficiency improved as the operating principles were discovered, which led to the development of the science of thermodynamics. See graph:Steam Engine Efficiency

In earliest steam engines the boiler was considered part of the engine. Today they are considered separate, so it is necessary to know whether stated efficiency is overall, which includes the boiler, or just of the engine.

Comparisons of efficiency and power of the early steam engines is difficult for several reasons: 1) there was no standard weight for a bushel of coal, which could be anywhere from 82 to 96 pounds (37 to 44 kg). 2) There was no standard heating value for coal, and probably no way to measure heating value. The coals had much higher heating value than today's steam coals, with 13,500 BTU/pound (31 megajoules/kg) sometimes mentioned. 3) Efficiency was reported as "duty", meaning how many foot pounds (or newton-metres) of work lifting water were produced, but the mechanical pumping efficiency is not known.

The first piston steam engine, developed by Thomas Newcomen around 1710, was slightly over one half percent (0.5%) efficient. It operated with steam at near atmospheric pressure drawn into the cylinder by the load, then condensed by a spray of cold water into the steam filled cylinder, causing a partial vacuum in the cylinder and the pressure of the atmosphere to drive the piston down. Using the cylinder as the vessel in which to condense the steam also cooled the cylinder, so that some of the heat in the incoming steam on the next cycle was lost in warming the cylinder, reducing the thermal efficiency. Improvements made by John Smeaton to the Newcomen engine increased the efficiency to over 1%.

James Watt made several improvements to the Newcomen engine, the most significant of which was the external condenser, which prevented the cooling water from cooling the cylinder. Watt's engine operated with steam at slightly above atmospheric pressure. Watt's improvements increased efficiency by a factor of over 2.5. The lack of general mechanical ability, including skilled mechanics, machine tools, and manufacturing methods, limited the efficiency of actual engines and their design until about 1840.

Higher-pressured engines were developed by Oliver Evans and Richard Trevithick, working independently. These engines were not very efficient but had high power-to-weight ratio, allowing them to be used for powering locomotives and boats.

The centrifugal governor, which had first been used by Watt to maintain a constant speed, worked by throttling the inlet steam, which lowered the pressure, resulting in a loss of efficiency on the high (above atmospheric) pressure engines. Later control methods reduced or eliminated this pressure loss.

The improved valving mechanism of the Corliss steam engine (Patented. 1849) was better able to adjust speed with varying load and increased efficiency by about 30%. The Corliss engine had separate valves and headers for the inlet and exhaust steam so the hot feed steam never contacted the cooler exhaust ports and valving. The valves were quick acting, which reduced the amount of throttling of the steam and resulted in faster response. Instead of operating a throttling valve, the governor was used to adjust the valve timing to give a variable steam cut-off. The variable cut-off was responsible for a major portion of the efficiency increase of the Corliss engine.

Others before Corliss had at least part of this idea, including Zachariah Allen, who patented variable cut-off, but lack of demand, increased cost and complexity and poorly developed machining technology delayed introduction until Corliss.

The Porter-Allen high-speed engine (ca. 1862) operated at from three to five times the speed of other similar-sized engines. The higher speed minimized the amount of condensation in the cylinder, resulting in increased efficiency.

Compound engines gave further improvements in efficiency. By the 1870s triple-expansion engines were being used on ships. Compound engines allowed ships to carry less coal than freight. Compound engines were used on some locomotives but were not widely adopted because of their mechanical complexity.

A well-designed and built steam locomotive used to get around 7–8% efficiency in its peak. The most efficient reciprocating steam engine design (per stage) was the uniflow engine, but by the time it appeared steam was being displaced by more efficient diesel engines which required less labor (for coal handling and oiling), used a more dense fuel, and displaced less cargo.

Using statistics collected during the early 1940s, the Santa Fe Railroad measured the efficiency of their fleet of steam locomotives in comparison with the FT units that they were just putting into service in significant numbers. They determined that the cost of a ton of oil fuel used in steam engines was $5.04 and yielded 20.37 train miles system wide on average. Diesel fuel cost $11.61 but produced 133.13 train miles per ton. In effect, diesels ran six times as far as steamers utilizing fuel that cost only twice as much. This was due to the much better thermal efficiency of diesel engines compared to steam. Presumably the trains used as a milage standard were 4,000 ton freight consists which was the normal [tonnage] at that time.

— Jim Valle, "How efficient is a steam engine?"

==== Steam turbine ====
The steam turbine is the most efficient steam engine and for this reason is universally used for electrical generation. Steam expansion in a turbine is nearly continuous, which makes a turbine comparable to a very large number of expansion stages. Steam power stations operating at the critical point have efficiencies in the low 40% range. Turbines produce direct rotary motion and are far more compact and weigh far less than reciprocating engines and can be controlled to within a very constant speed. As is the case with the gas turbine, the steam turbine works most efficiently at full power, and poorly at slower speeds. For this reason, despite their high power to weight ratio, steam turbines have been primarily used in applications where they can be run at a constant speed. In AC electrical generation maintaining an extremely constant turbine speed is necessary to maintain the correct frequency.

=== Stirling engines ===
The Stirling engine has the highest theoretical efficiency of any thermal engine but it has a low output power to weight ratio, therefore Stirling engines of practical output tend to be large. The size effect of the Stirling engine is due to its reliance on the expansion of a gas with an increase in temperature and practical limits on the working temperature of engine components. For an ideal gas, increasing its absolute temperature for a given volume, only increases its pressure proportionally, therefore, where the low pressure of the Stirling engine is atmospheric, its practical pressure difference is constrained by temperature limits and is typically not more than a couple of atmospheres, making the piston pressures of the Stirling engine very low, hence relatively large piston areas are required to obtain useful output power.

== See also ==
- Chrysler Turbine Car (1963)
- Fuel efficiency
- Specific fuel consumption (shaft engine)
- Specific impulse
