= Scotch yoke =

Mechanism to convert between rotational and reciprocating motion

Scotch yoke animation

The Scotch yoke (also known as slotted link mechanism) is a reciprocating motion mechanism converting the linear motion of a slider into rotational motion or vice versa. The piston or other reciprocating part is directly coupled to a sliding yoke with a slot that engages a pin on the rotating part. Given a constant rotational speed, the location of the piston versus time is simple harmonic motion, i.e., a sine wave having constant amplitude and constant frequency.

Comparison of displacement and acceleration for a Scotch yoke compared with a crank and slider

== Applications ==
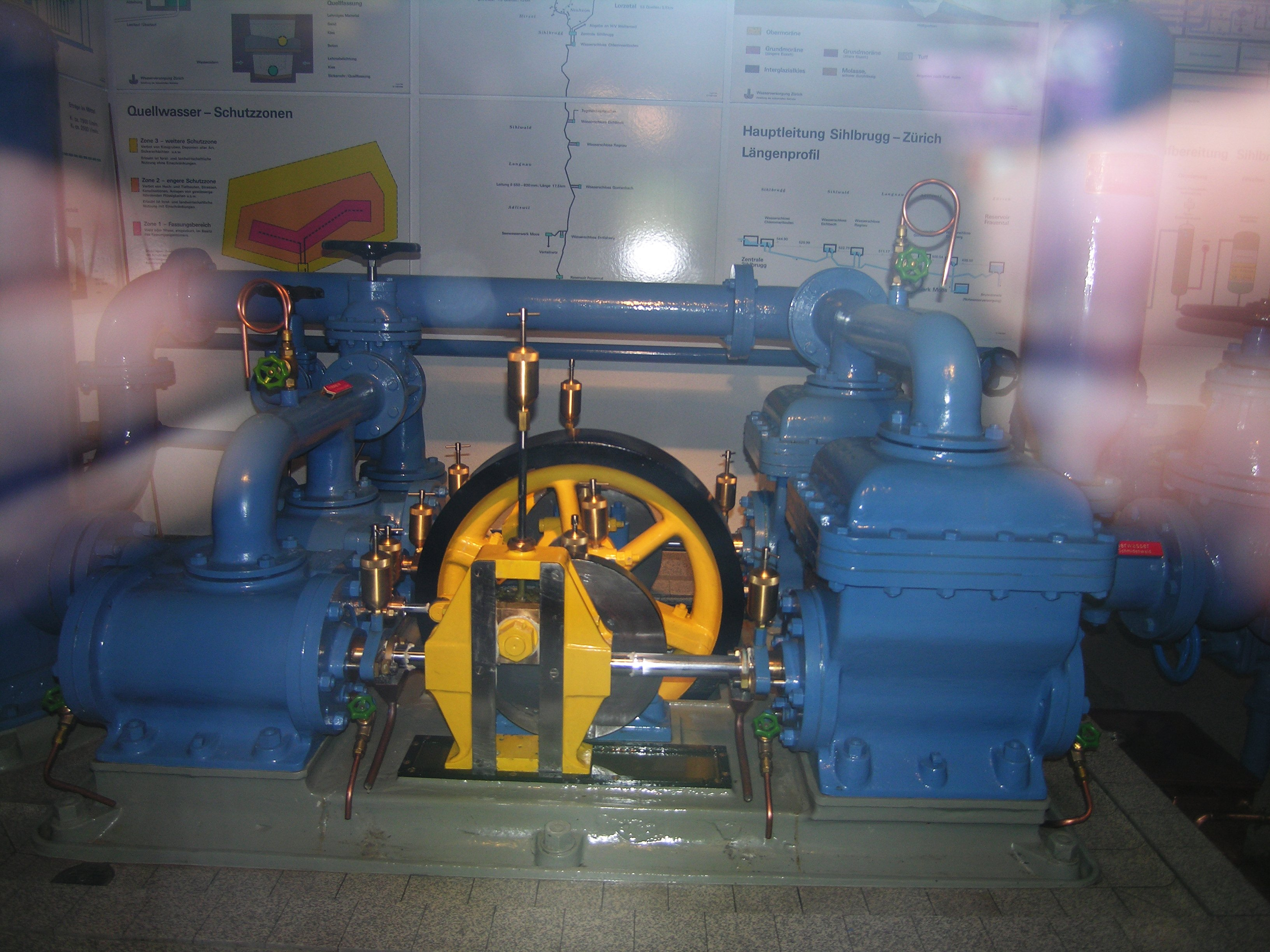
Piston water pump, with a Scotch yoke connection to its flywheel

Animation

This setup is most commonly used in control valve actuators in high-pressure oil and gas pipelines.

Although not a common metalworking machine nowadays, crude shapers can use Scotch yokes. Almost all those use a Whitworth linkage, which gives a slow speed forward cutting stroke and a faster return.

It has been used in various internal combustion engines, such as the Bourke engine, SyTech engine, and many hot air engines and steam engines.

The term Scotch yoke continues to be used when the slot in the yoke is shorter than the diameter of the circle made by the crank pin. For example, the side rods of a locomotive may have Scotch yokes to permit vertical motion of intermediate driving axles.

What is essentially a Scotch yoke is used in the Tide-Predicting Machine No. 2 to generate a sinusoidal motion (sine functions).

== Internal combustion engine uses ==
Under ideal engineering conditions, force is applied directly in the line of travel of the assembly. The sinusoidal motion, cosinusoidal velocity, and sinusoidal acceleration (assuming constant angular velocity) result in smoother operation. The higher percentage of time spent at top dead centre (dwell) improves theoretical engine efficiency of constant volume combustion cycles. It allows the elimination of joints typically served by a wrist pin, and near elimination of piston skirts and cylinder scuffing, as side loading of piston due to sine of connecting rod angle is mitigated. The longer the distance between the piston and the yoke, the less wear that occurs, but greater the inertia, making such increases in the piston rod length realistically only suitable for lower RPM (but higher torque) applications.

The Scotch yoke is not used in most internal combustion engines because of the rapid wear of the slot in the yoke caused by sliding friction and high contact pressures. This is mitigated by a sliding block between the crank and the slot in the piston rod. Also, increased heat loss during combustion due to extended dwell at top dead centre offsets any constant volume combustion improvements in real engines. In an engine application, less percent of the time is spent at bottom dead centre when compared to a conventional piston and crankshaft mechanism, which reduces blowdown time for two-stroke engines. Experiments have shown that extended dwell time does not work well with constant volume combustion Otto cycle engines. Gains might be more apparent in internal combustion engines using a stratified direct injection (Diesel or similar) cycle to reduce heat losses.
