= Planer (metalworking) =

Machining tool which uses linear relative motion between the workpiece and tool bit

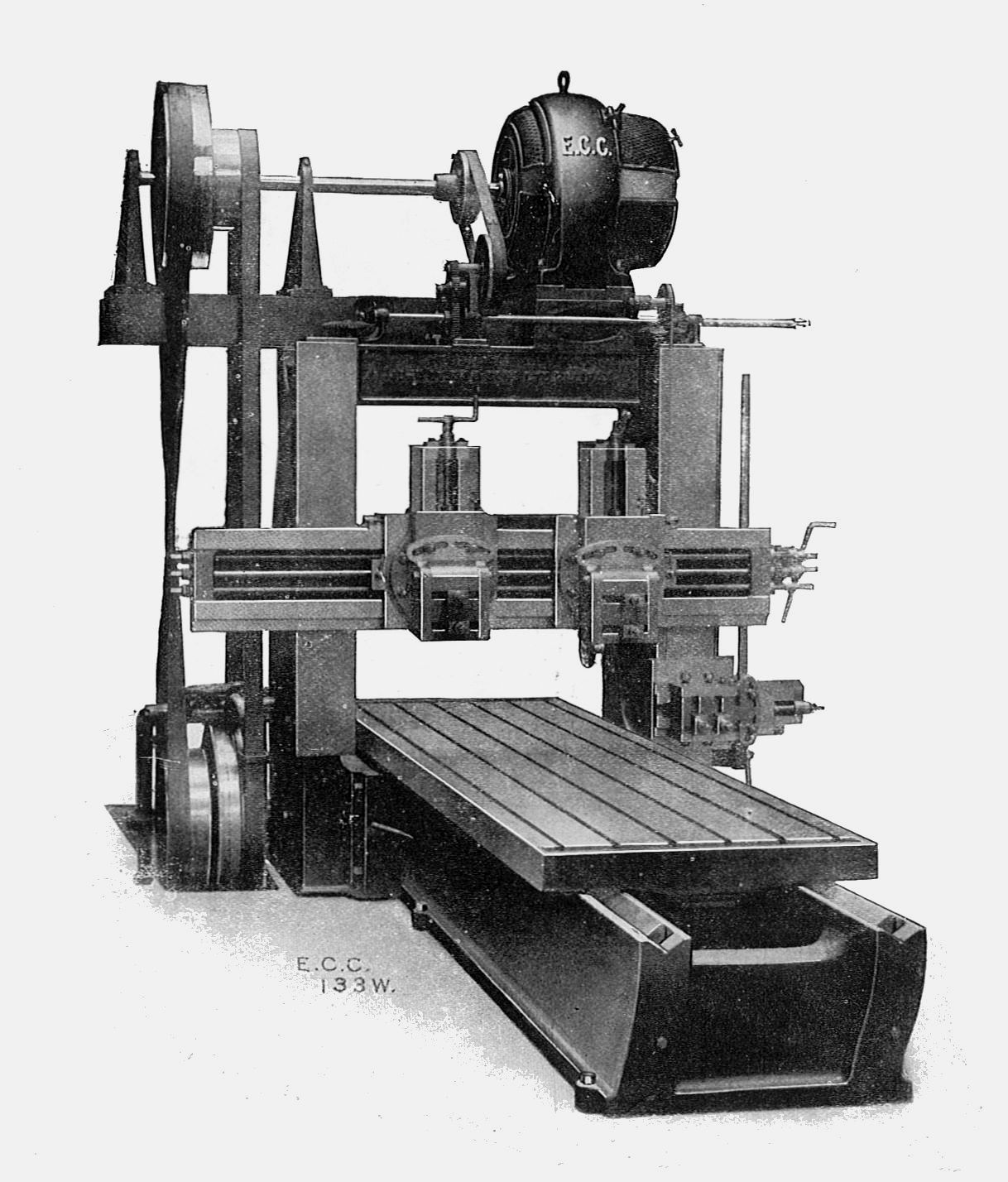
A typical planer

A planer is a type of metalworking machine tool that uses linear relative motion between the workpiece and a single-point cutting tool to cut the work piece. A planer is similar to a shaper, save for its larger size and stationary cutting tool.

== Applications ==
=== Linear planing ===
The most common applications of planers and shapers are linear-toolpath ones, such as:

- Generating accurate flat surfaces. (While not as precise as grinding, a planer can remove a tremendous amount of material in one pass with high accuracy.)
- Cutting slots (such as keyways).
- It is even possible to do work that might now be done by wire EDM in some cases. Starting from a drilled or cored hole, a planer with a boring-bar type tool can cut internal features that do not lend themselves to milling or boring (such as irregularly shaped holes with tight corners).

=== Helical planing ===
Although the archetypal toolpath of a planer is linear, helical cutting can be accomplished by coupling the table's linear motion to simultaneous rotation. The helical planing idea is similar to both helical milling and single-point screw cutting.

=== Current usage ===
Planers and shapers are now obsolescent, because other machine tools (such as milling machines, broaching machines, and grinding machines) have mostly eclipsed them as the tools of choice for doing such work. However, they have not yet disappeared from the metalworking world. Planers are used by smaller tool and die shops within larger production facilities to maintain and repair large stamping dies and plastic injection molds. Additional uses include any other task where an abnormally large (usually in the range of 4'×8' or more) block of metal must be squared when a (quite massive) horizontal grinder or floor mill is unavailable, too expensive, or otherwise impractical in a given situation. As usual in the selection of machine tools, an old machine that is in hand, still works, and is long since paid-for has substantial cost advantage over a newer machine that would need to be purchased. This principle easily explains why "old-fashioned" techniques often have a long period of gradual obsolescence in industrial contexts, rather than a sharp drop-off of prevalence such as is seen in mass-consumer technology fashions.

== Configurations and sizes ==
There are two types of planers for metal: double-housing and open-side. The double-housing variety has vertical supports on both sides of its long bed; the open-side variety has a vertical support on only one side, allowing the workpiece to extend beyond the bed. Metal planers can vary in size from a table size of 30"×72" to 20'×62', and in weight from around 20,000 lbs to over 1,000,000 lbs.

== History ==
Early planing ideas are known to have been underway in France in the 1750s. In the late 1810s, a variety of pioneers in various British shops (including James Fox, George Rennie, Matthew Murray, Joseph Clement, and Richard Roberts) developed the planer into what we today would call a machine tool. The exact details have been contentious and will probably never be known, because the development work being done in various shops was undocumented for various reasons (partially because of proprietary secrecy, and also simply because no one was taking down records for posterity). Roe (1916) provides a short chapter that tells the story as thoroughly as he was able to discover it.

== Bibliography ==
- Roe, Joseph Wickham (1916), English and American Tool Builders, New Haven, Connecticut: Yale University Press, LCCN 16011753. Reprinted by McGraw-Hill, New York and London, 1926 (LCCN 27-24075); and by Lindsay Publications, Inc., Bradley, Illinois (ISBN 978-0-917914-73-7).
