= James Fox (engineer) =

British machine tool builder

James Fox, (fl. 1780–1830), machine tool maker, was originally a butler in the service of the Rev. Thomas Gisborne, of Foxhall Lodge, Staffordshire. He had a strong interest in handicraft and his employer not only encouraged him, but enabled him to set up in business on his own account.

The growth and extension of the cotton, silk, lace and hosiery trades, in the district of Derby, created a great demand for skilled machine-makers and provided Fox with opportunities and he soon found ample scope for employment. His lace machinery became celebrated, and he supplied it largely to the neighbouring town of Nottingham; he also obtained considerable employment from the great firms of Arkwright and Strutt –– the founders of the modern cotton manufacture. Fox became celebrated for his lathes, which were of excellent quality, and besides making for British demand, he exported much machinery abroad, to France, Russia and Mauritius. Fox is also said at a very early period to have invented a screw-cutting machine, an engine for accurately dividing and cutting the teeth of wheels, and a self-acting lathe, but details are obscure.

Fox made one of the first planing machines, reportedly in 1814 but the priority between Fox, Matthew Murray of Leeds and Richard Roberts of Manchester has not yet been established due to the secrecy of the makers.

Fox's business at Derby was carried on by his sons and was active into the final third of the 19th century, but the later history is not known.

Fox machine tools were illustrated in contemporary literature and some survive as museum pieces in Birmingham and in Norway. An example of a Fox lathe is on display at Wortley Top Forge, South Yorkshire. (www.topforge.co.uk)
