= Shaper =

Machine tool which linearly cuts or grinds the workpiece

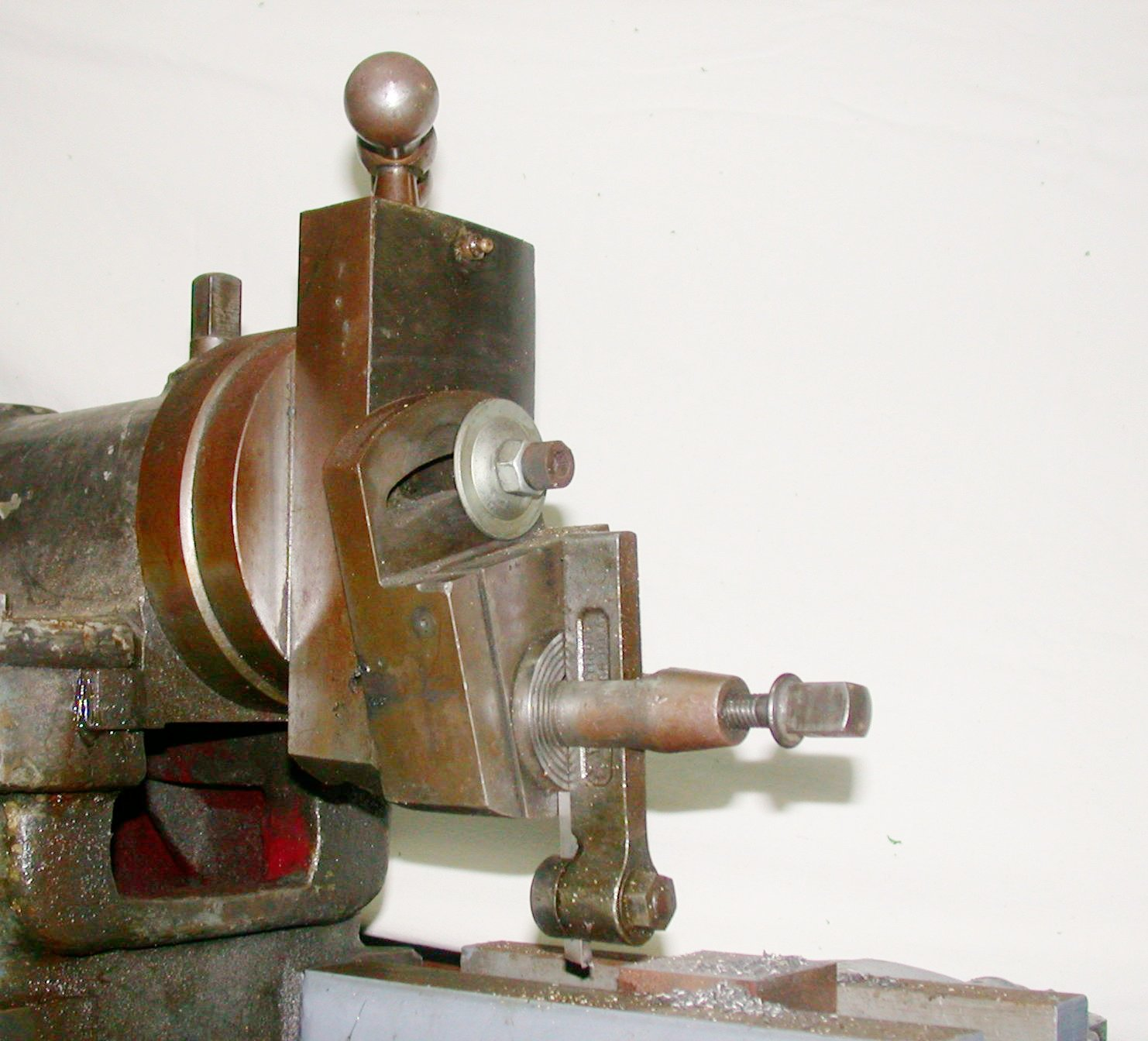
Shaper tool slide, clapper box and cutting tool

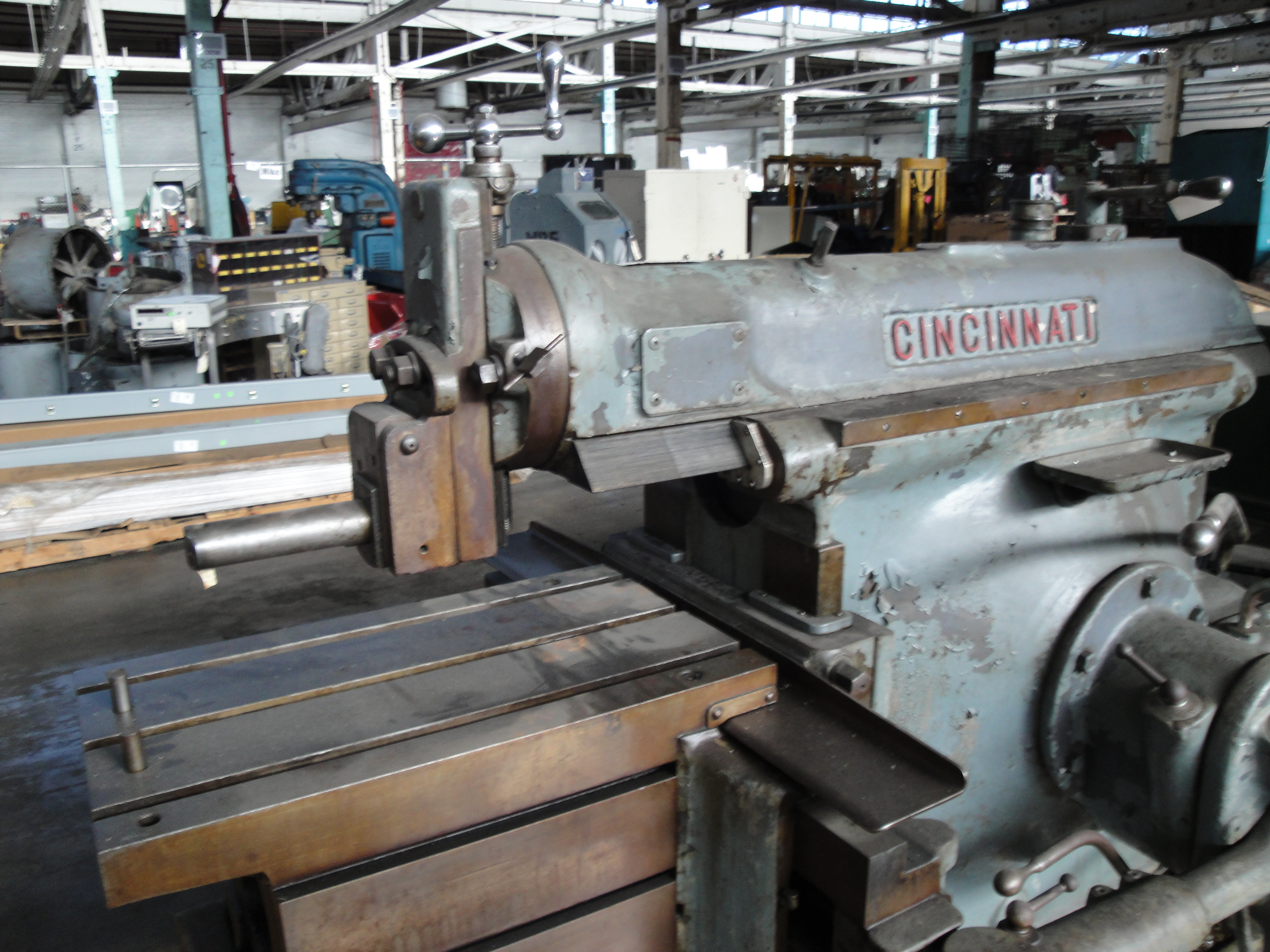
Shaper with boring bar setup to allow cutting of internal features, such as keyways, or even shapes that might otherwise be cut with wire EDM

In machining, a shaper or shaping machine is a type of machine tool that uses linear relative motion between the workpiece and a single-point cutting tool to machine a linear toolpath. Its cut is analogous to that of a lathe, except that it is (archetypally) linear instead of rotary.

A wood shaper is a functionally different woodworking tool, typically with a powered rotating cutting head and manually fed workpiece, usually known simply as a shaper in North America and spindle moulder in the UK.

A metalworking shaper is somewhat analogous to a metalworking planer, with the cutter riding a ram that moves relative to a stationary workpiece, rather than the workpiece moving beneath the cutter. The ram is typically actuated by a mechanical crank inside the column, though hydraulically actuated shapers are increasingly used. Adding additional axes of motion to a shaper can yield helical tool paths, as also done in helical planing.

== Process ==
A single-point cutting tool is rigidly held in the tool holder, which is mounted on the ram. The work piece is rigidly held in a vise or clamped directly on the table. The table may be supported at the outer end. The ram reciprocates and the cutting tool, held in the tool holder, moves forwards and backwards over the work piece. In a standard shaper, cutting of material takes place during the forward stroke of the ram and the return stroke remains idle. The return is governed by a quick return mechanism. The depth of the cut increments by moving the workpiece, and the workpiece is fed by a pawl and ratchet mechanism.

== Types ==
Shapers are mainly classified as standard, draw-cut, horizontal, universal, vertical, geared, crank, hydraulic, contour and traveling head, with a horizontal arrangement most common. Vertical shapers are generally fitted with a rotary table to enable curved surfaces to be machined (same idea as in helical planing). The vertical shaper is essentially the same thing as a slotter (slotting machine), although technically a distinction can be made if one defines a true vertical shaper as a machine whose slide can be moved from the vertical. A slotter is fixed in the vertical plane

== Operation ==
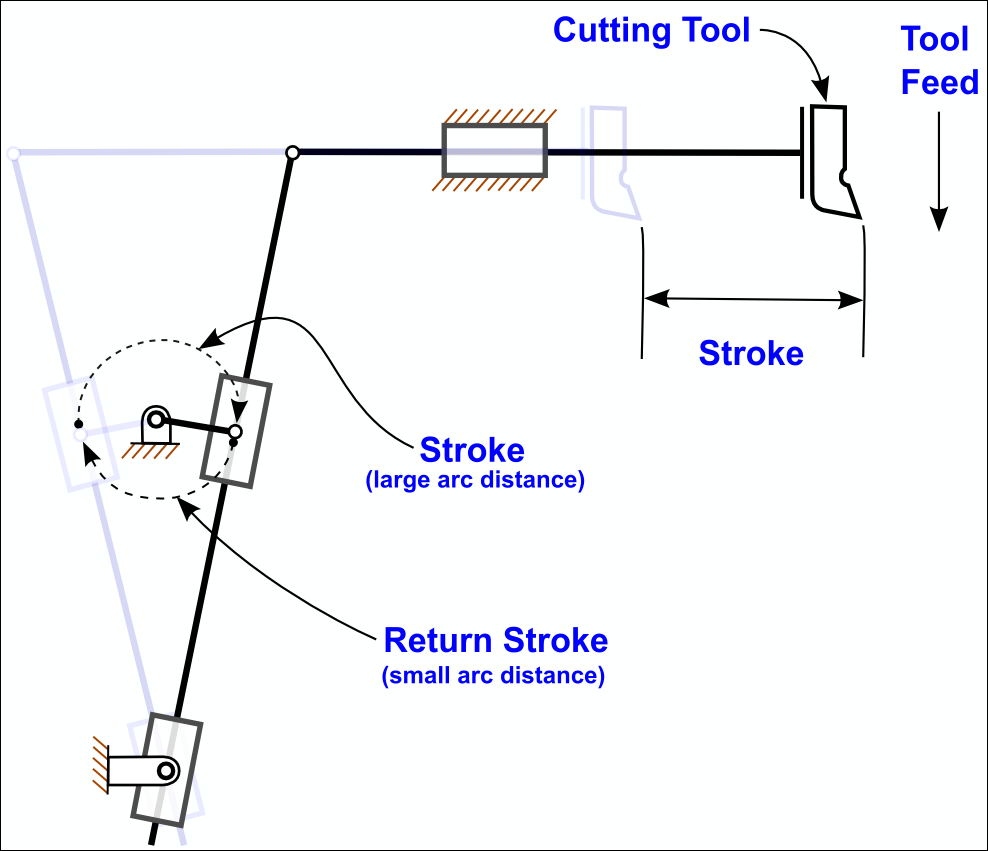
Shaper linkage. Note that the drive arm revolves through a smaller angle on the return stroke than for the cutting stroke, resulting in a quicker return stroke and more powerful cutting stroke.

The workpiece mounts on a rigid, box-shaped table in front of the machine. The height of the table can be adjusted to suit this workpiece, and the table can traverse sideways underneath the reciprocating tool, which is mounted on the ram. Table motion may be controlled manually, but is usually advanced by an automatic feed mechanism acting on the feedscrew. The ram slides back and forth above the work. At the front end of the ram is a vertical tool slide that may be adjusted to either side of the vertical plane along the stroke axis. This tool-slide holds the clapper box and tool post, from which the tool can be positioned to cut a straight, flat surface on the top of the workpiece. The tool-slide permits feeding the tool downwards to deepen a cut. This flexibility, coupled with the use of specialized cutters and toolholders, enables the operator to cut internal and external gear teeth.

The ram is adjustable for stroke and, due to the geometry of the linkage, it moves faster on the return (non-cutting) stroke than on the forward, cutting stroke. This return stroke is governed by a quick return mechanism.

== Uses ==
The most common use is to machine straight, flat surfaces, but with ingenuity and some accessories a wide range of work can be done. Other examples of its use are:

- Keyways in the hub of a pulley or gear can be machined without resorting to a dedicated broaching setup.
- Dovetail slides
- Internal splines and gear teeth.
- Keyway, spline, and gear tooth cutting in blind holes
- Cam drums with toolpaths of the type that in CNC milling terms would require 4- or 5-axis contouring or turn-mill cylindrical interpolation
- It is even possible to obviate wire EDM work in some cases. Starting from a drilled or cored hole, a shaper with a boring-bar type tool can cut internal features that do not lend themselves to milling or boring (such as irregularly shaped holes with tight corners).
- Smoothing of a rough surface

== History ==
Samuel Bentham developed a shaper between 1791 and 1793. However, Roe (1916) credits James Nasmyth with the invention of the shaper in 1836. Shapers were very common in industrial production from the mid-19th century through the mid-20th. In current industrial practice, shapers have been largely superseded by other machine tools (especially of the CNC type), including milling machines, grinding machines, and broaching machines. But the basic function of a shaper is still sound; tooling for them is minimal and very cheap to reproduce; and they are simple and robust in construction, making their repair and upkeep easily achievable. Thus, they are still popular in many machine shops, from jobbing shops or repair shops to tool and die shops, where only one or a few pieces are required to be produced, and the alternative methods are cost- or tooling-intensive. They also have considerable retro appeal to many hobbyist machinists, who are happy to obtain a used shaper or, in some cases, even to build a new one from scratch.

== See also ==
- Planer (metalworking)

== Bibliography ==
- Roe, Joseph Wickham (1916), English and American Tool Builders, New Haven, Connecticut: Yale University Press, LCCN 16011753. Reprinted by McGraw-Hill, New York and London, 1926 (LCCN 27-24075); and by Lindsay Publications, Inc., Bradley, Illinois (ISBN 978-0-917914-73-7).
