= Proportionality =

Proportionality, proportion or proportional may refer to:

== Mathematics ==
- Proportionality (mathematics), the property of two variables being in a multiplicative relation to a constant
- Ratio, of one quantity to another, especially of a part compared to a whole
  - Fraction (mathematics)
- Aspect ratio or proportions
- Proportional division, a kind of fair division
- Percentage, a number or ratio expressed as a fraction of 100

== Science and art ==
- Proportional fonts
- Proportionally fair, a scheduling algorithm
- Proportional control, a type of linear feedback control system

== Other uses ==
- Proportionality (law), a legal principle
- Proportionality (International Humanitarian Law), a law of war
- Proportion (architecture), describes the relationships between elements of a design
- Body proportions, in art, the study of relation of human body parts to each other and the whole

== See also ==
- Proportional representation, in electoral systems
- Proporz, Austrian political practice
