= Bourke engine =

Type of internal combustion engine

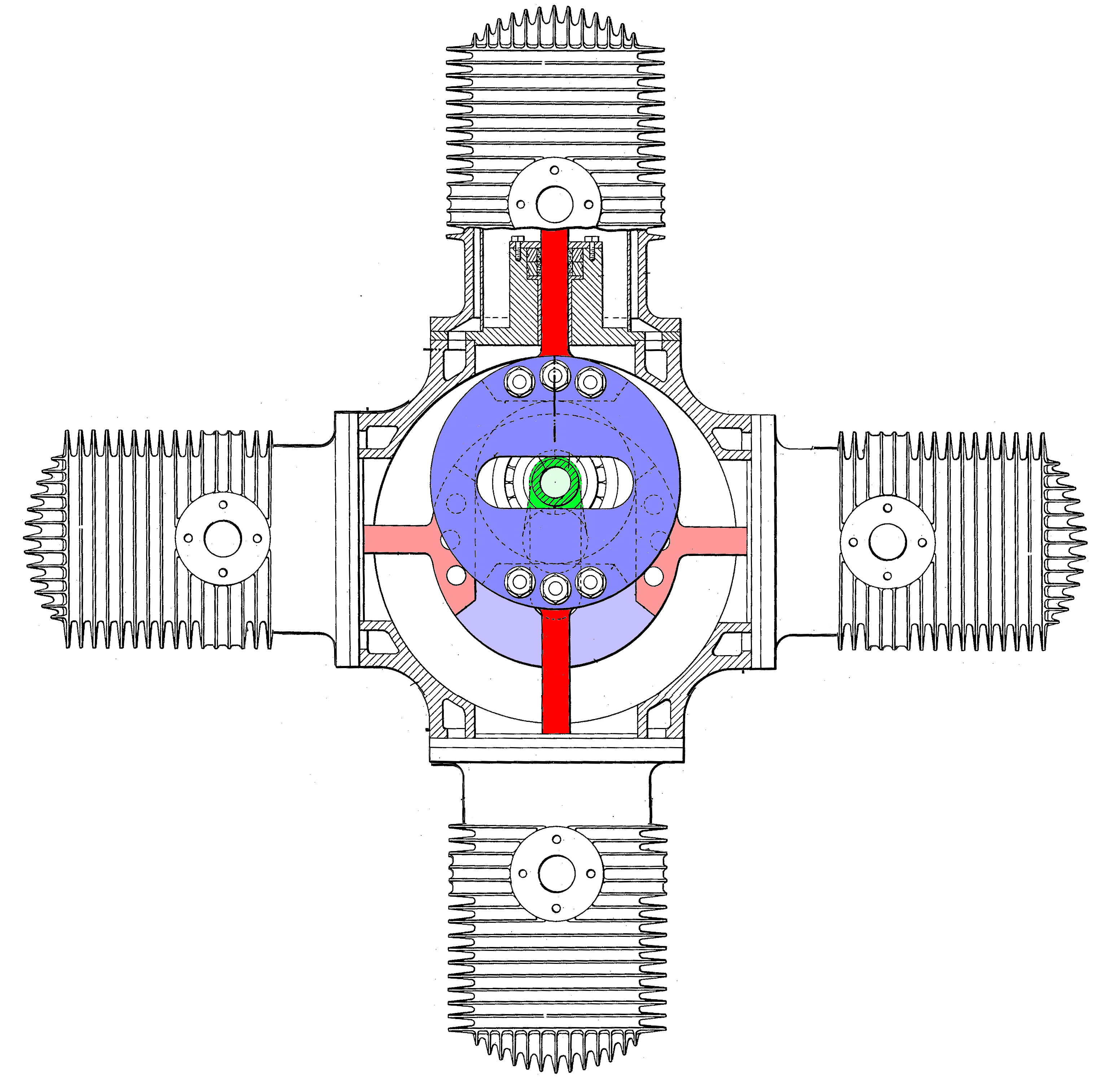
Four-cylinder Bourke engine

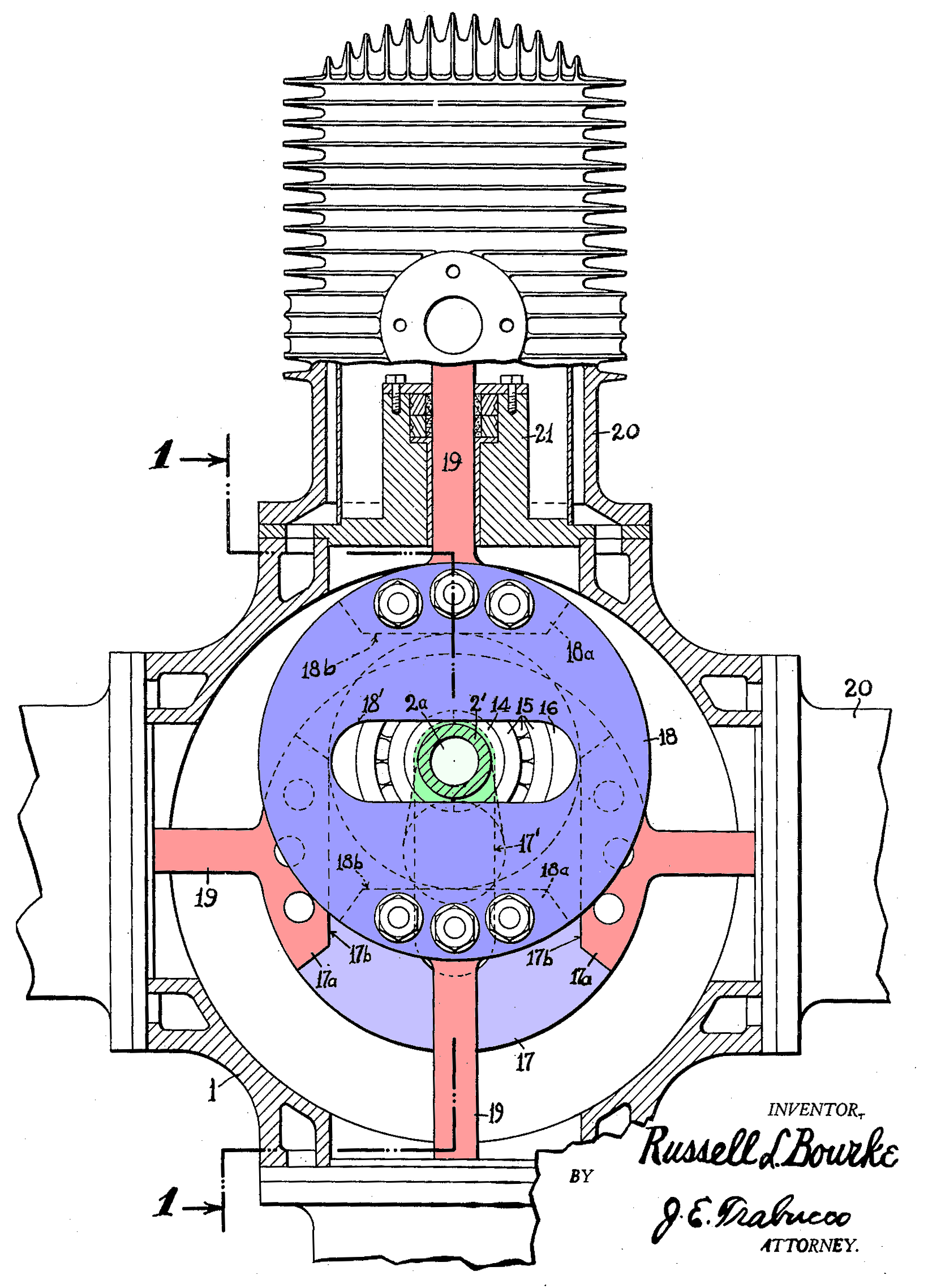
Figure 2 from Patent US 2172670 A

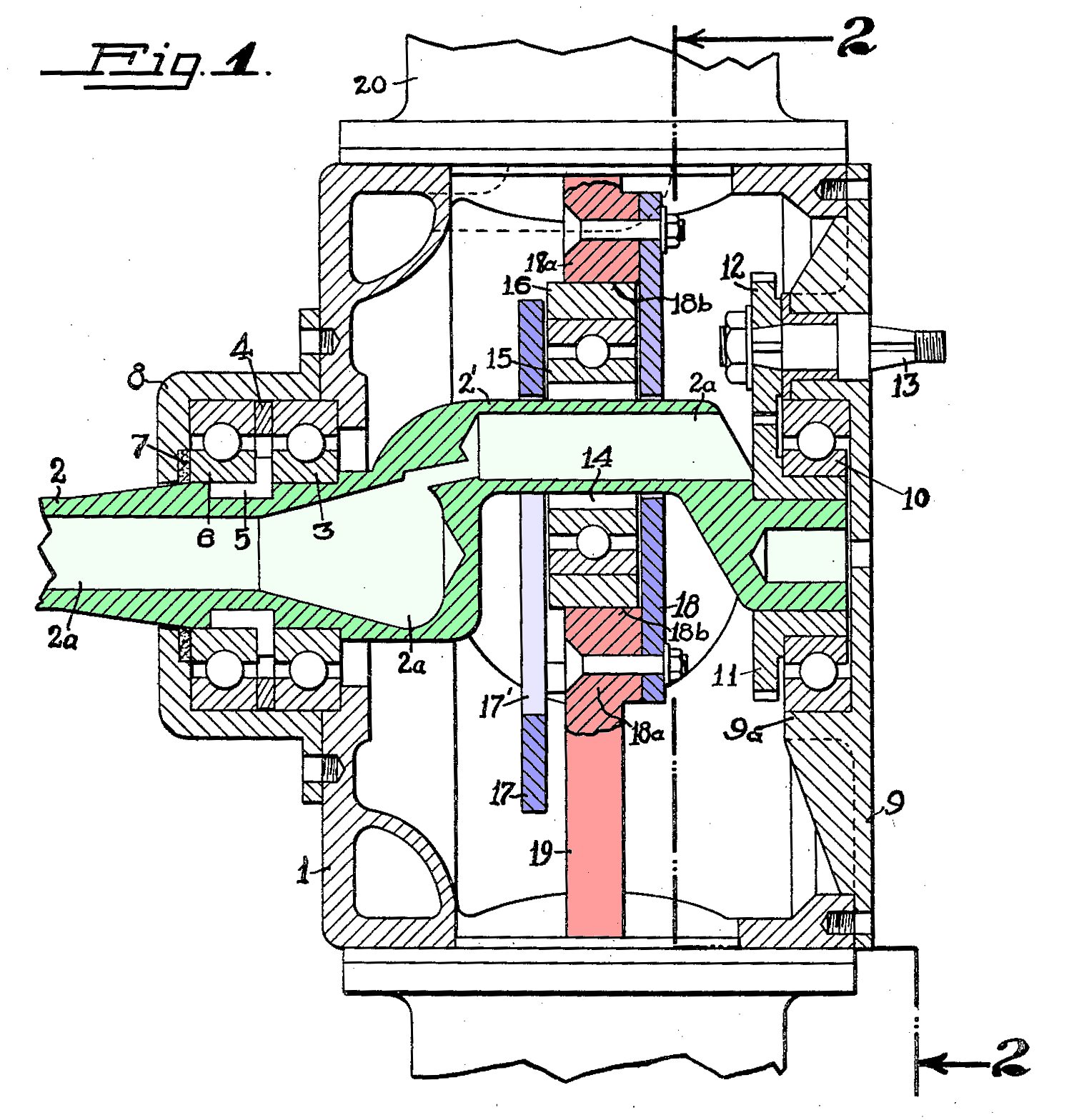
Figure 1 from Patent US 2172670 A

Animation of a four-cylinder bourke engine

The Bourke engine was an attempt by Russell Bourke in the 1920s to improve the two-stroke internal combustion engine. Despite finishing his design and building several working engines, the onset of World War II, lack of test results, and the poor health of his wife compounded to prevent his engine from ever coming successfully to market. The main claimed virtues of the design are that it has only two moving parts, is lightweight, has two power pulses per revolution, and does not need oil mixed into the fuel.

The Bourke engine is a two-stroke design, with one horizontally opposed piston assembly using two pistons that move in the same direction at the same time, so that their operations are 180 degrees out of phase. The pistons are connected to a Scotch yoke mechanism in place of the more usual crankshaft mechanism, thus the piston acceleration is perfectly sinusoidal. This causes the pistons to spend more time at top dead center than conventional engines. The incoming charge is compressed in a chamber under the pistons, as in a conventional crankcase-charged two-stroke engine. The connecting-rod seal prevents the fuel from contaminating the bottom-end lubricating oil.

== Operation ==
The operating cycle is very similar to that of a current production spark ignition two-stroke with crankcase compression, with two modifications:

1. The fuel is injected directly into the air as it moves through the transfer port.
2. The engine is designed to run without using spark ignition once it is warmed up. This is known as auto-ignition or dieseling, and the air/fuel mixture starts to burn due to the high temperature of the compressed gas, and/or the presence of hot metal in the combustion chamber.

== Design features ==
The following design features have been identified:

=== Mechanical features ===
- Scotch yoke, and linearly sliding connecting rods.
- Fewer moving parts (only 2 moving assemblies per opposed cylinder pair) and the opposed cylinders are combinable to make 2, 4, 6, 8, 10, 12 or any even number of cylinders.
- The piston is connected to the Scotch yoke through a slipper bearing (a type of hydrodynamic tilting-pad fluid bearing).
- Mechanical fuel injection.
- Ports rather than valves.
- Easy maintenance (top overhauling) with simple tools.
- The Scotch yoke does not create lateral forces on the piston, reducing friction and piston wear.
- O-rings are used to seal joints rather than gaskets.
- The Scotch yoke makes the pistons dwell very slightly longer at top dead center, so the fuel burns more completely in a smaller volume.

=== Gas flow and thermodynamic features ===
- Low exhaust temperature (below that of boiling water) so that metal exhaust components are not required; plastic ones can be used if strength is not required from exhaust system.
- 15:1 to 24:1 compression ratio for high efficiency and it can be easily changed as required for different fuels and operation requirements.
- Fuel is vaporised when it is injected into the transfer ports, and the turbulence in the intake manifolds and the piston shape above the rings stratifies the fuel–air mixture into the combustion chamber.
- Lean burn for increased efficiency and reduced emissions.

=== Lubrication ===
- This design uses oil seals to prevent the pollution from the combustion chamber (created by piston ring blow-by in four-strokes and just combustion in two-strokes) from polluting the crankcase oil, extending the life of the oil as it is used slowly for keeping the rings full of oil. Oil was shown to be used slowly, but checking the quantity and cleanliness of it was still recommended by Russell Bourke, its creator.
- The lubricating oil in the base is protected from combustion chamber pollution by an oil seal over the connecting rod.
- The piston rings are supplied with oil from a small supply hole in the cylinder wall at bottom dead center.

== Claimed and measured performance ==
- Efficiency - 0.25 (lb/h)/hp is claimed - about the same as the best diesel engine, or roughly twice as efficient as the best two strokes. This is equivalent to a thermodynamic efficiency of 55.4%, which is an exceedingly high figure for a small internal combustion engine. In a test witnessed by a third party, the actual fuel consumption was 1.1 hp/(lb/hr), or 0.9 (lb/hr)/hp, equivalent to a thermodynamic efficiency of about 12.5%, which is typical of a 1920s steam engine. A test of a 30 cubic inch Vaux engine, built by a close associate of Bourke, gave a fuel consumption of 1.48 lb/(bhp hr), or 0.7 (lb/hr)/hp at maximum power.
- Power to weight - The Silver Eagle was claimed to produce 25 hp from 45 lb, or a power-to-weight ratio of 0.55 hp/lb. The larger 140 cubic inch engine was good for 120 hp from 125 lb, or approximately 1 hp/lb. The Model H was claimed to produce 60 hp with a weight of 95 lb, hence giving a power to weight ratio of 0.63 hp/lb. The 30 cu in twin was reported to produce 114 hp at 15000rpm while weighing only 38 lb, an incredible 3 hp/lb However a 30 cu in replica from Vaux Engines produced just 8.8 hp at 4000 rpm, even after substantial reworking. Other sources claim 0.9 to 2.5 hp/lb, although no independently witnessed test to support these high figures has been documented. The upper range of this is roughly twice as good as the best four-stroke production engine shown here, or 0.1 hp/lb better than a Graupner G58 two-stroke. The lower claim is unremarkable, easily exceeded by production four-stroke engines, never mind two strokes.
- Emissions - Achieved virtually no hydrocarbons (80 ppm) or carbon monoxide (less than 10 ppm) in published test results, however no power output was given for these results and NOx was not measured.
- Low Emissions - The engine is claimed to be able to operate on hydrogen or any hydro-carbon fuel without any modifications, producing only water vapor and carbon dioxide as emissions.

== Engineering analysis of the Bourke engine ==
The Bourke Engine has some interesting features, but the extravagant claims for its performance are unlikely to be borne out by real tests. Many of the claims are contradictory.

1. Seal friction from the seal between the air compressor chamber and the crankcase, against the connecting rod, will reduce the efficiency.
2. Efficiency will be reduced due to pumping losses, as the air charge is compressed and expanded twice but energy is only extracted for power in one of the expansions per piston stroke.
3. Engine weight is likely to be high because it will have to be strongly built to cope with the high peak pressures seen as a result of the rapid high temperature combustion.
4. Each piston pair is highly imbalanced as the two pistons move in the same direction at the same time, unlike in a boxer engine. This will limit the speed range and hence the power of the engine, and increase its weight due to the strong construction necessary to react the high forces in the components.
5. High speed two-stroke engines tend to be inefficient compared with four-strokes because some of the intake charge escapes unburnt with the exhaust.
6. Use of excess air will reduce the torque available for a given engine size.
7. Forcing the exhaust out rapidly through small ports will incur a further efficiency loss.
8. Operating an internal combustion engine in detonation reduces efficiency due to heat lost from the combustion gases being scrubbed against the combustion chamber walls by the shock waves.
9. Emissions - although some tests have shown low emissions in some circumstances, these were not necessarily at full power. As the scavenge ratio (i.e. engine torque) is increased more HC and CO will be emitted.
10. Increased dwell time at TDC will allow more heat to be transferred to the cylinder walls, reducing the efficiency.
11. When running in auto-ignition mode the timing of the start of the burn is controlled by the operating state of the engine, rather than directly as in a spark ignition or diesel engine. As such it may be possible to optimize it for one operating condition, but not for the wide range of torques and speeds that an engine typically sees. The result will be reduced efficiency and higher emissions.
12. If the efficiency is high, then combustion temperatures must be high, as required by the Carnot cycle, and the air fuel mixture must be lean. High combustion temperatures and lean mixtures cause nitrogen dioxide to be formed.

== Patents ==
Russell Bourke obtained British and Canadian patents for the engine in 1939: GB514842 and CA381959.

He also obtained U.S. patent 2,172,670 in 1939.
