= Broaching (metalworking) =

Tool with teeth used to cut metal

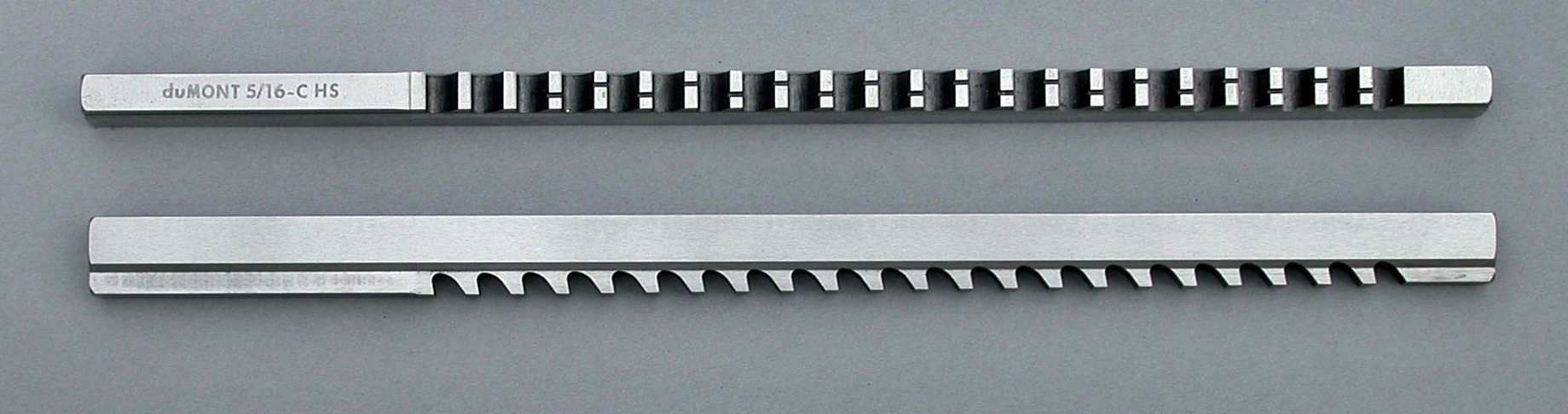
A push style 5/16 inch (8 mm) keyway broach; note how the teeth are larger on the left end.

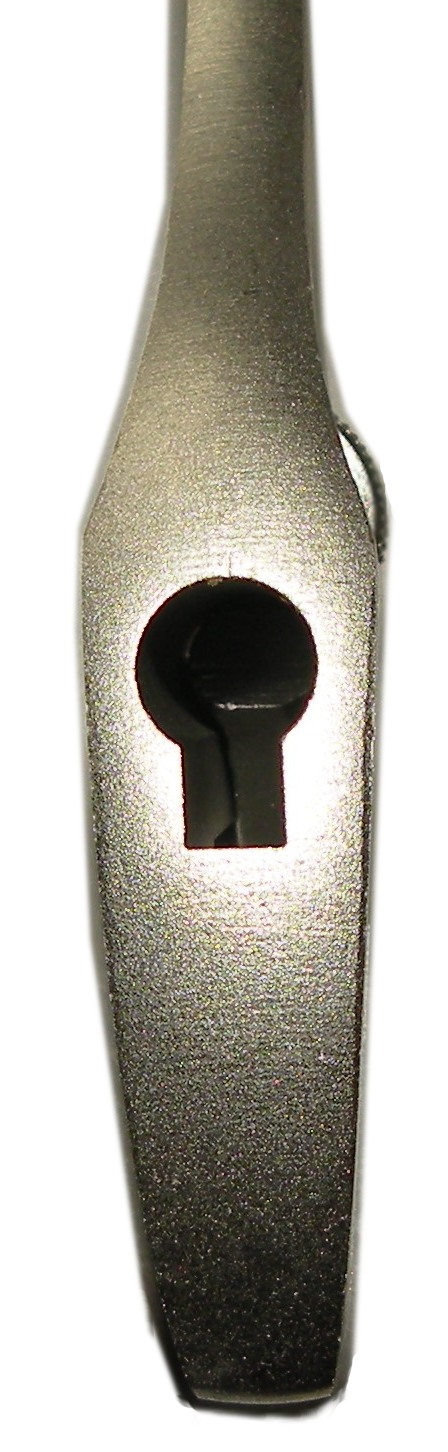
A broached keyway in the end of an adjustable wrench

Broaching is a machining process that uses a toothed tool, called a broach, to remove material. There are two main types of broaching: linear and rotary. In linear broaching, which is the more common process, the broach is run linearly against a surface of the workpiece to produce the cut. Linear broaches are used in a broaching machine, which is also sometimes shortened to broach. In rotary broaching, the broach is rotated and pressed into the workpiece to cut an axisymmetric shape. A rotary broach is used in a lathe or screw machine. In both processes the cut is performed in one pass of the broach, which makes it very efficient.

Broaching is used when precision machining is required, especially for odd shapes. Commonly machined surfaces include circular and non-circular holes, splines, keyways, and flat surfaces. Typical workpieces include small to medium-sized castings, forgings, screw machine parts, and stampings. Even though broaches can be expensive, broaching is usually favored over other processes when used for high-quantity production runs.

Broaches are shaped similar to a saw, except the height of the teeth increases over the length of the tool. Moreover, the broach contains three distinct sections: one for roughing, another for semi-finishing, and the final one for finishing. Broaching is an unusual machining process because it has the feed built into the tool. The profile of the machined surface is always the inverse of the profile of the broach. The rise per tooth (RPT), also known as the step or feed per tooth, determines the amount of material removed and the size of the chip. The broach can be moved relative to the workpiece or vice versa. Because all of the features are built into the broach, no complex motion or skilled labor is required to use it. A broach is effectively a collection of single-point cutting tools arrayed in sequence, cutting one after the other; its cut is analogous to multiple passes of a shaper.

== History ==
The concept of broaching can be traced back to the early 1850s, with the first applications used for cutting keyways in pulleys and gears. After World War I, broaching was used to rifle gun barrels. In the 1920s and 30s the tolerances were tightened and the cost reduced thanks to advances in form grinding and broaching machines.

== Process ==
The process depends on the type of broaching being performed. Surface broaching is very simple as either the workpiece is moved against a stationary surface broach, or the workpiece is held stationary while the broach is moved against it.

Internal broaching is more involved. The process begins by clamping the workpiece into a special holding fixture, called a workholder, which mounts in the broaching machine. The broaching machine elevator, which is the part of the machine that moves the broach above the workholder, then lowers the broach through the workpiece. Once through, the broaching machine's puller, essentially a hook, grabs the pilot of the broach. The elevator then releases the top of the follower and the puller pulls the broach through the workpiece completely. The workpiece is then removed from the machine and the broach is raised back up to reengage with the elevator. The broach usually only moves linearly, but sometimes it is also rotated to create a spiral spline or gun-barrel rifling.

Cutting fluids are used for three reasons:

1. to cool the workpiece and broach
2. to lubricate cutting surfaces
3. to flush the chips from the teeth.

Fortified petroleum cutting fluids are the most common. However, heavy-duty water-soluble cutting fluids are being used because of their superior cooling, cleanliness, and non-flammability.

== Usage ==
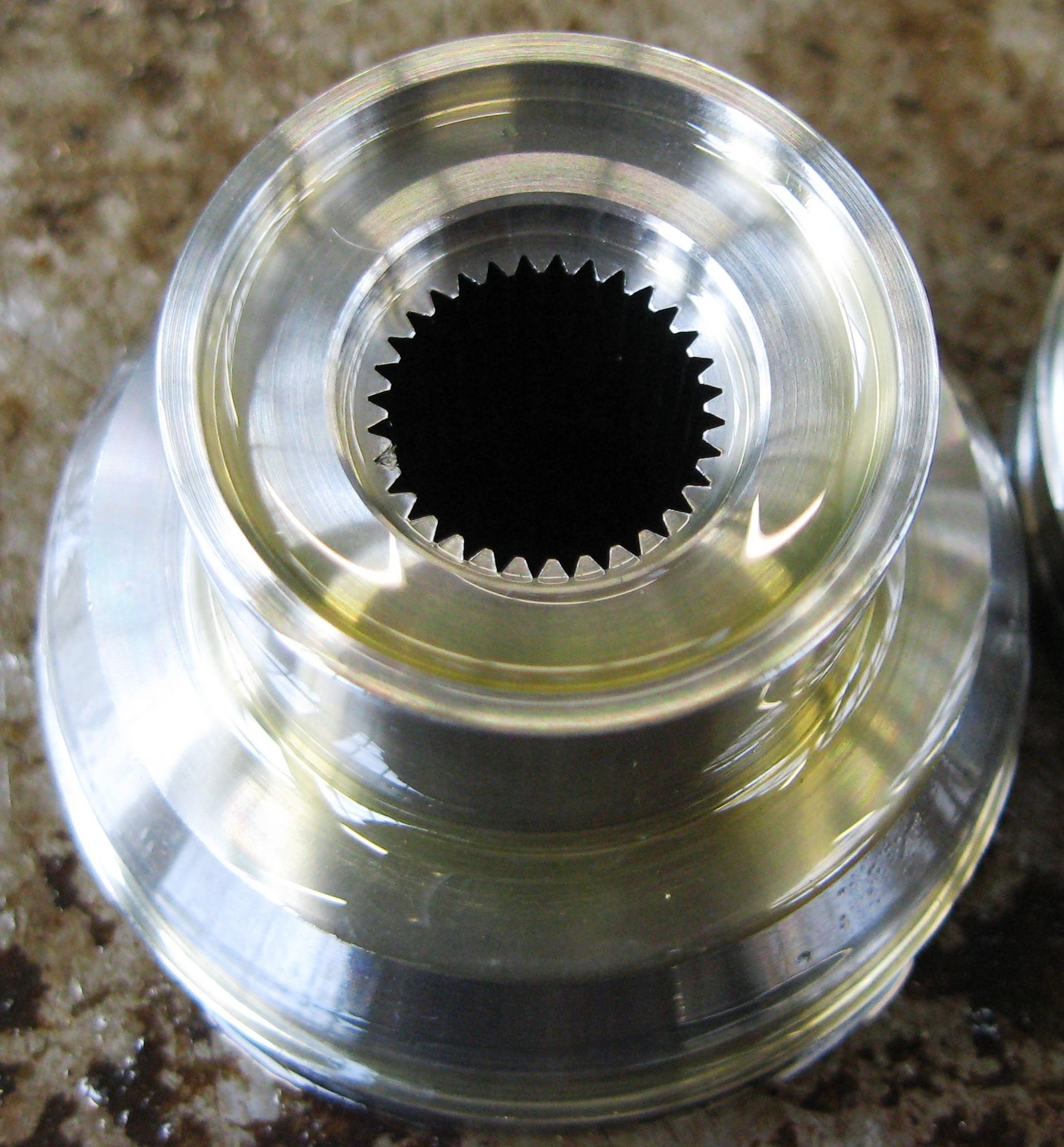
An example of a broached workpiece. Here the broaching profile is a spline.

Broaching was originally developed for machining internal keyways. However, it was soon discovered that broaching is very useful for machining other surfaces and shapes for high volume workpieces. Because each broach is specialized to cut just one shape, either the broach must be specially designed for the geometry of the workpiece or the workpiece must be designed around a standard broach geometry. A customized broach is usually only viable with high volume workpieces, because the broach can cost US$15,000 to US$30,000 to produce.

Broaching speeds vary from 20 to 120 surface feet per minute (SFPM). This results in a complete cycle time of 5 to 30 seconds. Most of the time is consumed by the return stroke, broach handling, and workpiece loading and unloading.

The only limitations on broaching are that there are no obstructions over the length of the surface to be machined, the geometry to be cut does not have curves in multiple planes, and that the workpiece is strong enough to withstand the forces involved. Specifically for internal broaching a hole must first exist in the workpiece so the broach can enter. Also, there are limits on the size of internal cuts. Common internal holes can range from 0.125 to 6 in (3.2 to 152.4 mm) in diameter but it is possible to achieve a range of 0.05 to 13 in (1.3 to 330.2 mm). Surface broaches' range is usually 0.075 to 10 in (1.9 to 254.0 mm), although the feasible range is 0.02 to 20 in (0.51 to 508.00 mm).

Tolerances are usually ±0.002 in (±0.05 mm), but in precise applications a tolerance of ±0.0005 in (±0.01 mm) can be held. Surface finishes are usually between 16 and 63 microinches (μin), but can range from 8 to 125 μin. There may be small burrs on the exit side of the cut.

Broaching works best on softer materials, such as brass, bronze, copper alloys, aluminium, graphite, hard rubbers, wood, composites, and plastic. However, it still has a good machinability rating on mild steels and free machining steels. When broaching, the machinability rating is closely related to the hardness of the material. For steels the ideal hardness range is between 16 and 24 Rockwell C (HRC); a hardness greater than HRC 35 will dull the broach quickly. Broaching is more difficult on harder materials, stainless steel and titanium, but is still possible.

== Types ==
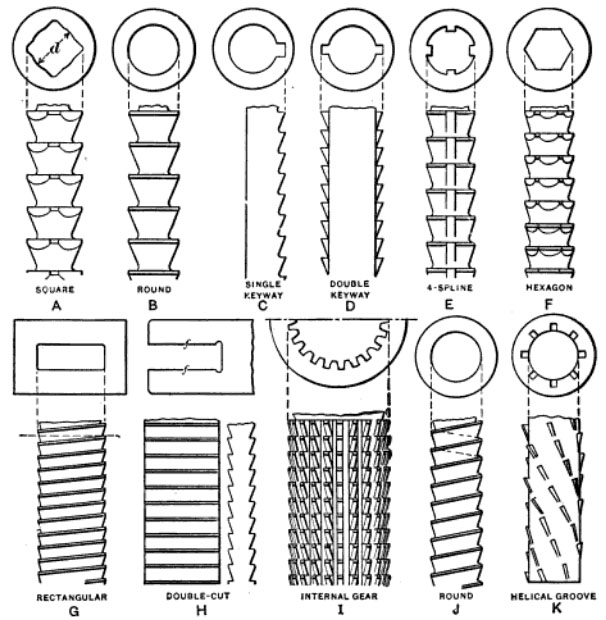

Broaches can be categorized by many means:

- Use: internal, or surface
- Purpose: single, or combination
- Motion: push, pull, or stationary
- Construction: solid, built-up, hollow or shell
- Function: roughing, sizing, or burnishing

If the broach is large enough the costs can be reduced by using a built-up or modular construction. This involves producing the broach in pieces and assembling it. If any portion wears out only that section has to be replaced, instead of the entire broach.

Most broaches are made from high speed steel (HSS) or an alloy steel; titanium nitride (TiN) coatings are common on HSS to prolong life. Except when broaching cast iron, tungsten carbide is rarely used as a tooth material because the cutting edge will crack on the first pass.

=== Surface broaches ===
The slab broach is the simplest surface broach. It is a general purpose tool for cutting flat surfaces.

Slot broaches (G & H) are for cutting slots of various dimensions at high production rates. Slot broaching is much quicker than milling when more than one slot needs to be machined, because multiple broaches can be run through the part at the same time on the same broaching machine.

Contour broaches are designed to cut concave, convex, cam, contoured, and irregular shaped surfaces.

Pot broaches are cut the inverse of an internal broach; they cut the outside diameter of a cylindrical workpiece. They are named after the pot looking fixture in which the broaches are mounted; the fixture is often referred to as a "pot". The pot is designed to hold multiple broaching tools concentrically over its entire length. The broach is held stationary while the workpiece is pushed or pulled through it. This has replaced hobbing for some involute gears and cutting external splines and slots.

Straddle broaches use two slab broaches to cut parallel surfaces on opposite sides of a workpiece in one pass. This type of broaching holds closer tolerances than if the two cuts were done independently. It is named after the fact that the broaches "straddle" the workpiece on multiple sides.

=== Internal broaches ===
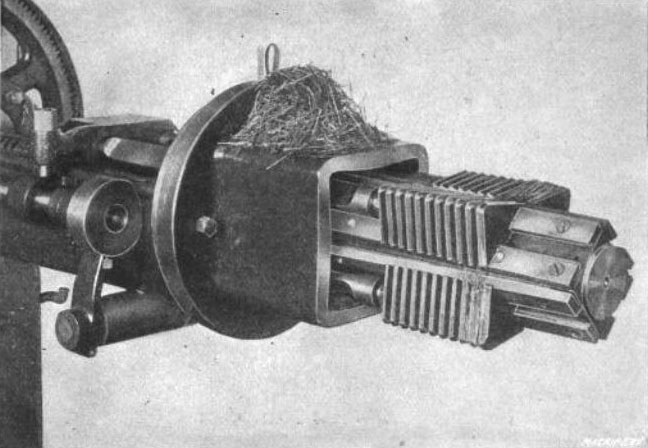
A modular broach

Solid broaches are the most common type; they are made from one solid piece of material. For broaches that wear out quickly shell broaches are used; these broaches are similar to a solid broach, except there is a hole through the center where it mounts on an arbor. Shell broaches cost more initially, but save the cost overall if the broach must be replaced often because the pilots are on the mandrel and do not have to be reproduced with each replacement.

Modular broaches are commonly used for large internal broaching applications. They are similar to shell broaches in that they are a multi-piece construction. This design is used because it is cheaper to build and resharpen and is more flexible than a solid design.

A common type of internal broach is the keyway broach (C & D). It uses a special fixture called a horn to support the broach and properly locate the part with relation to the broach.

A concentricity broach is a special type of spline cutting broach which cuts both the minor diameter and the spline form to ensure precise concentricity.

The cut-and-recut broach is used to cut thin-walled workpieces. Thin-walled workpieces have a tendency to expand during cutting and then shrink afterward. This broach overcomes that problem by first broaching with the standard roughing teeth, followed by a "breathing" section, which serves as a pilot as the workpiece shrinks. The teeth after the "breathing" section then include roughing, semi-finishing, and finishing teeth.

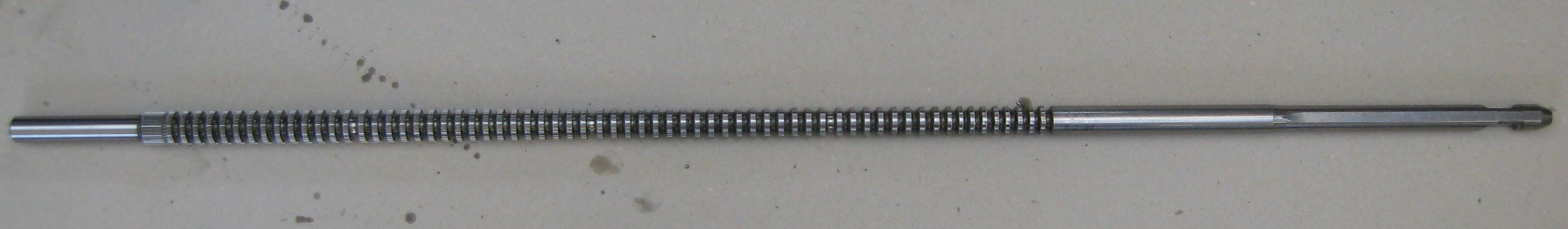
An internal broach for cutting splines

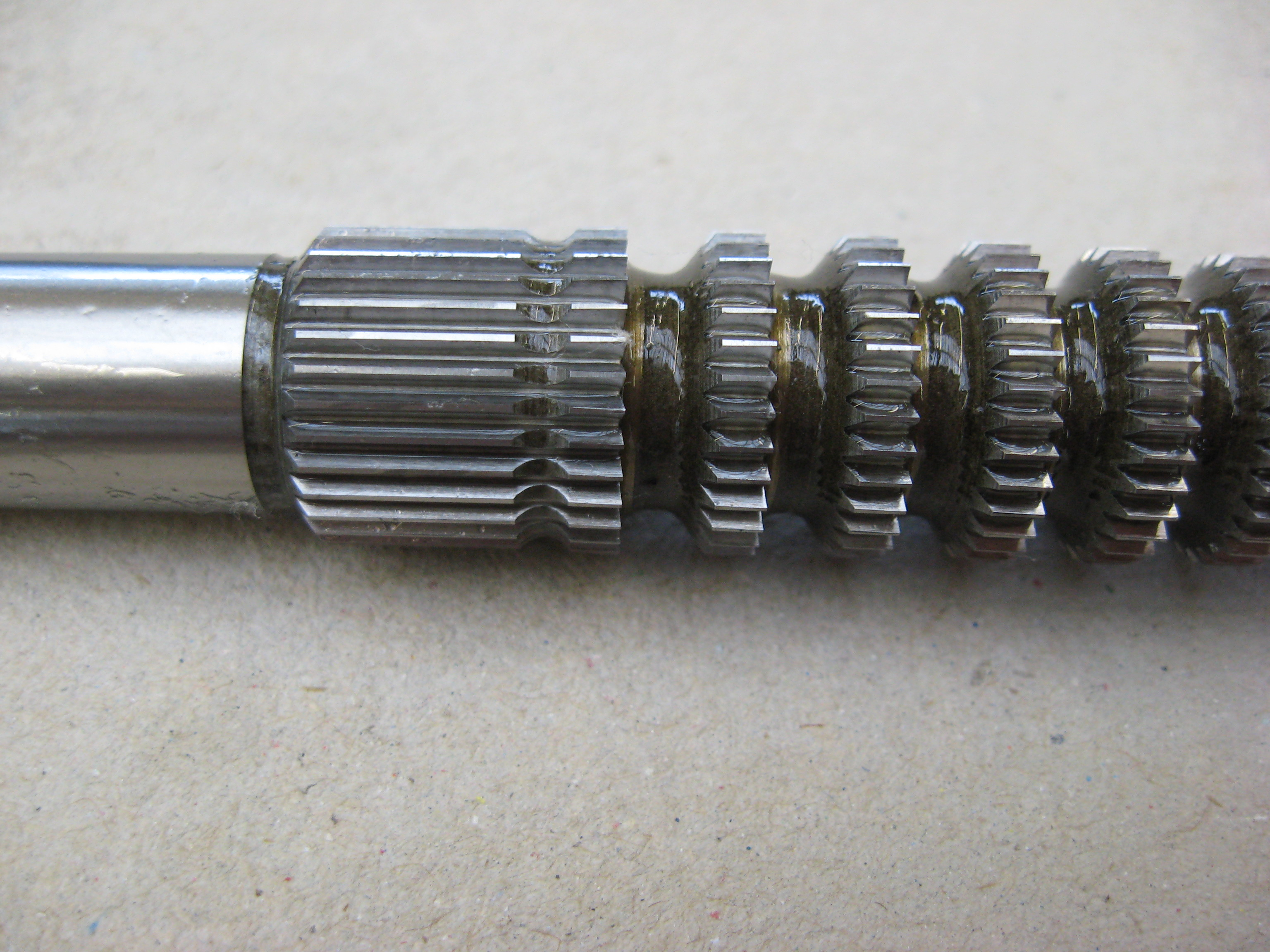
The finishing teeth

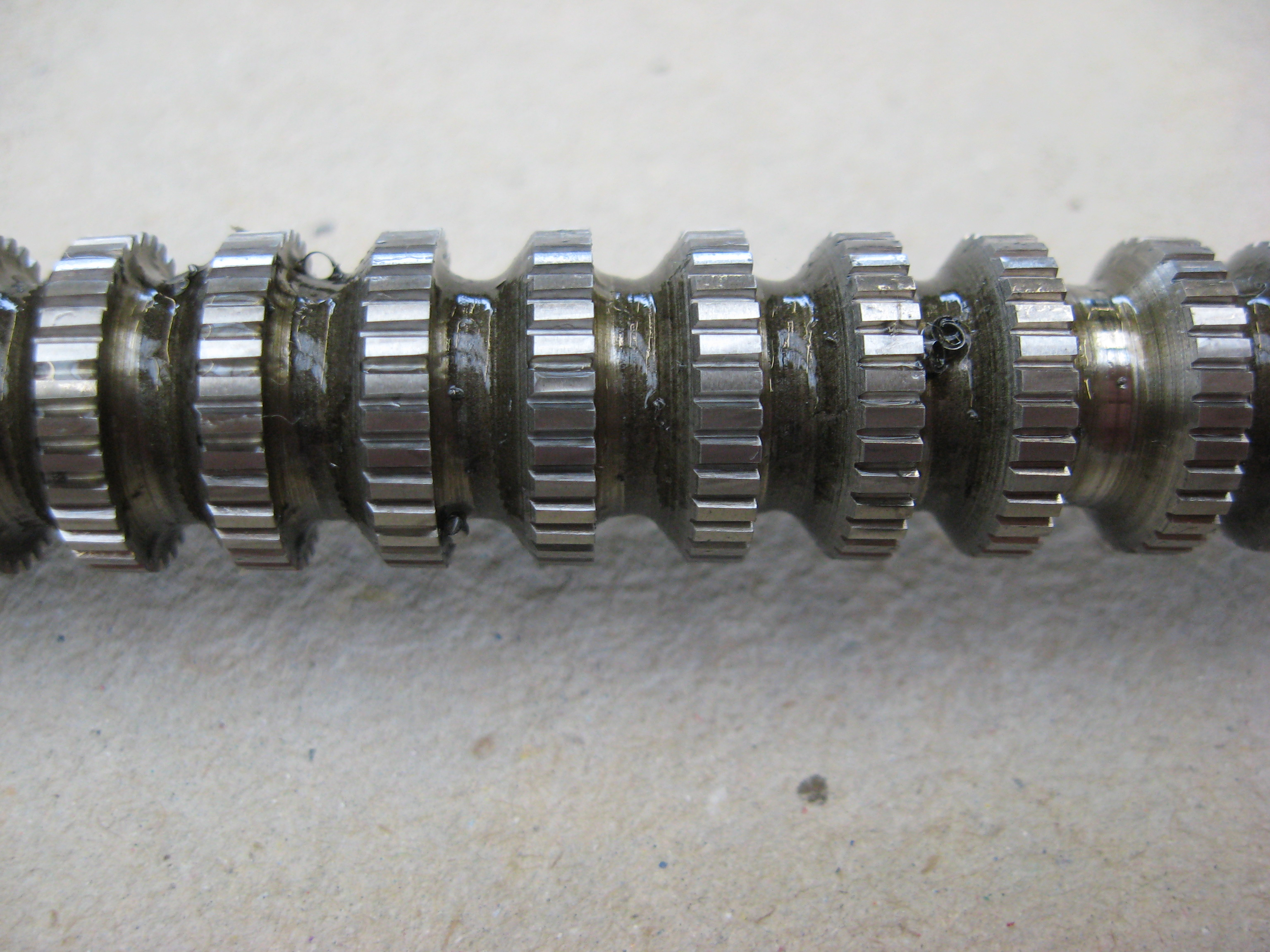
The semi-finishing teeth

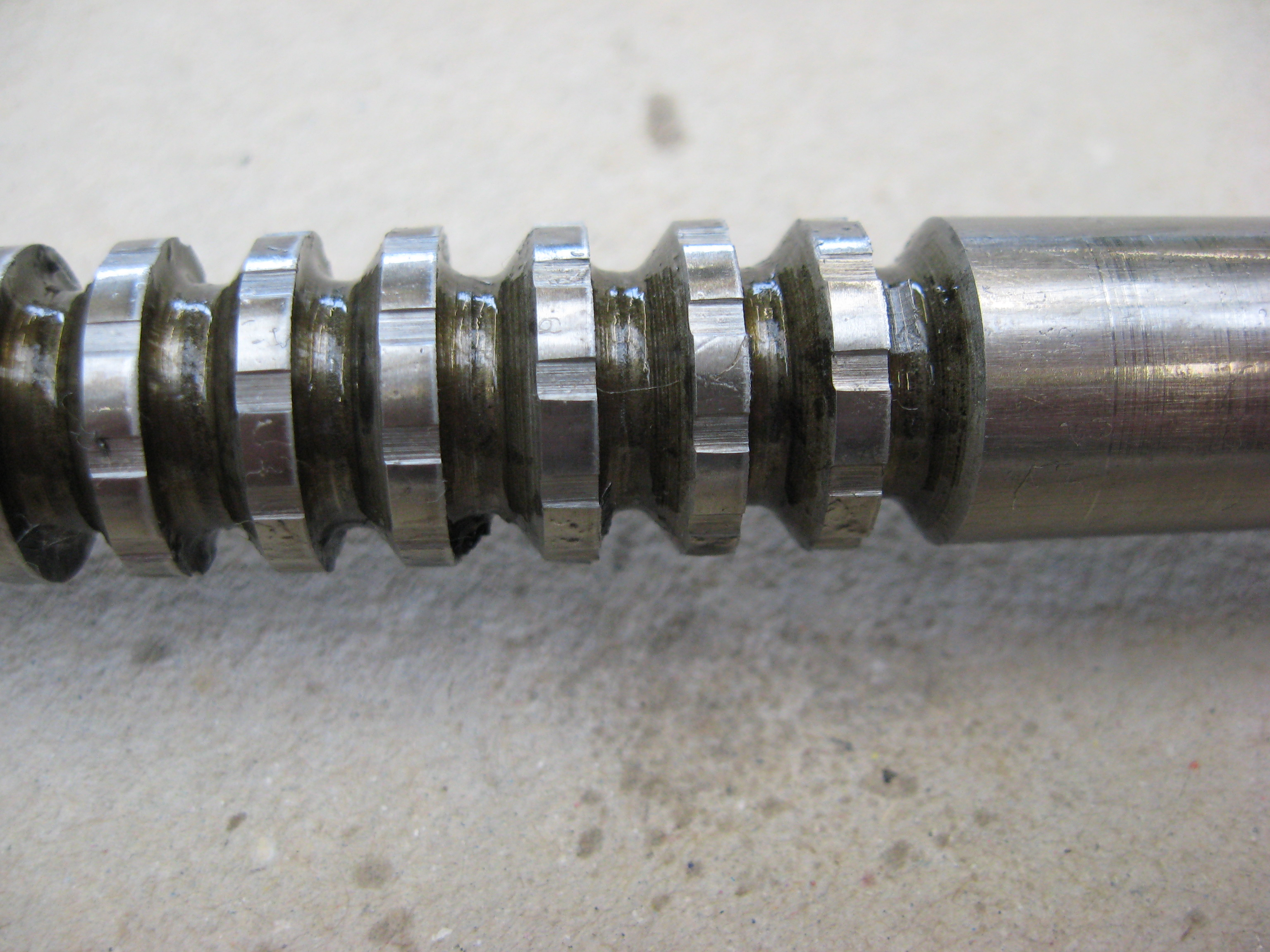
The roughing teeth

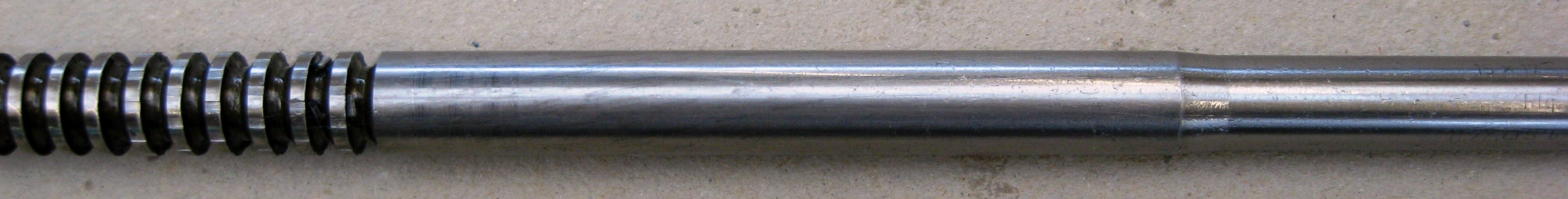
The front pilot

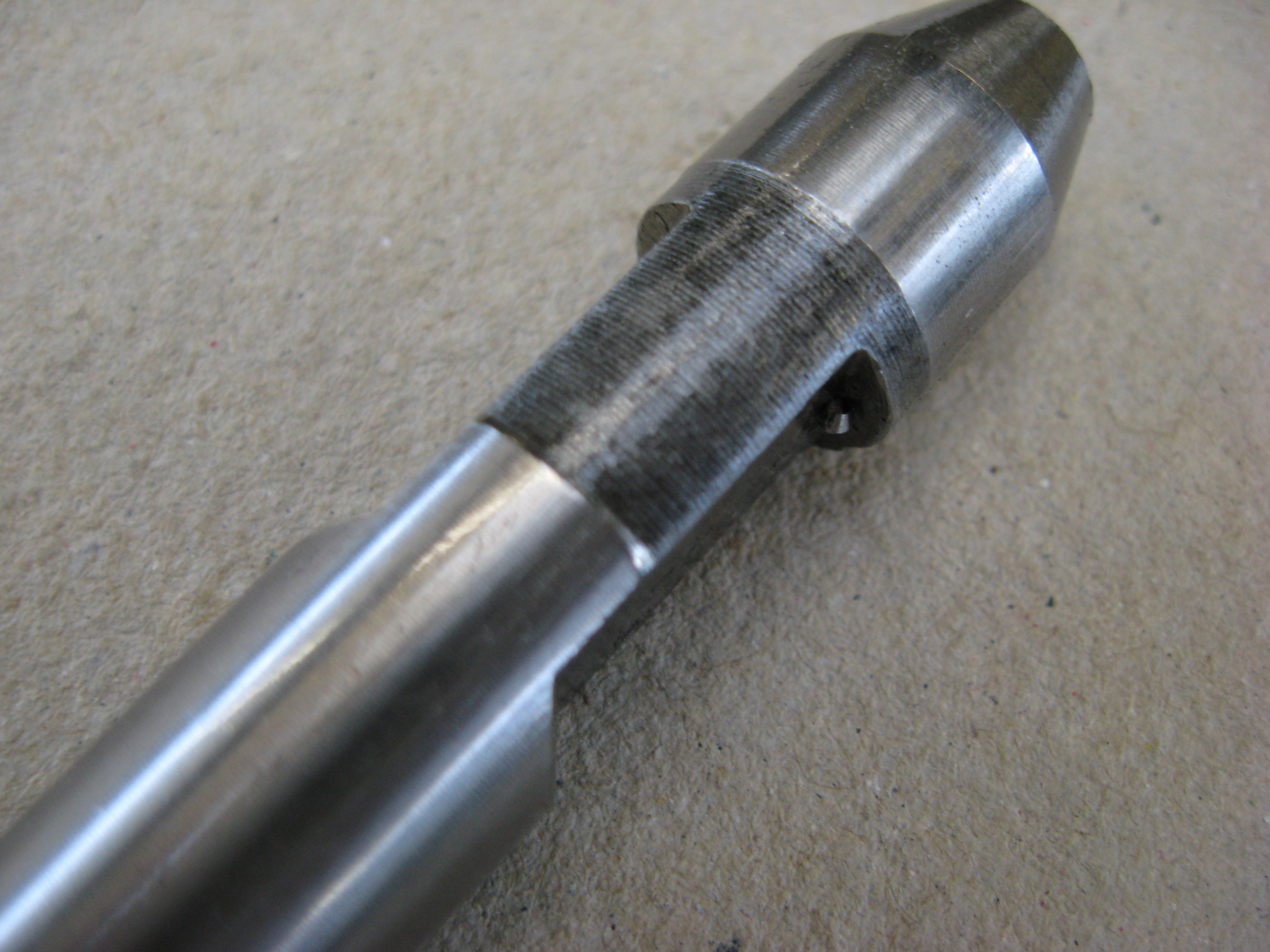
The slot in the tip of the broach where the broaching machine latches on to the broach to pull it through the workpiece

=== Design ===
For defining the geometry of a broach an internal type is shown below. Note that the geometries of other broaches are similar.

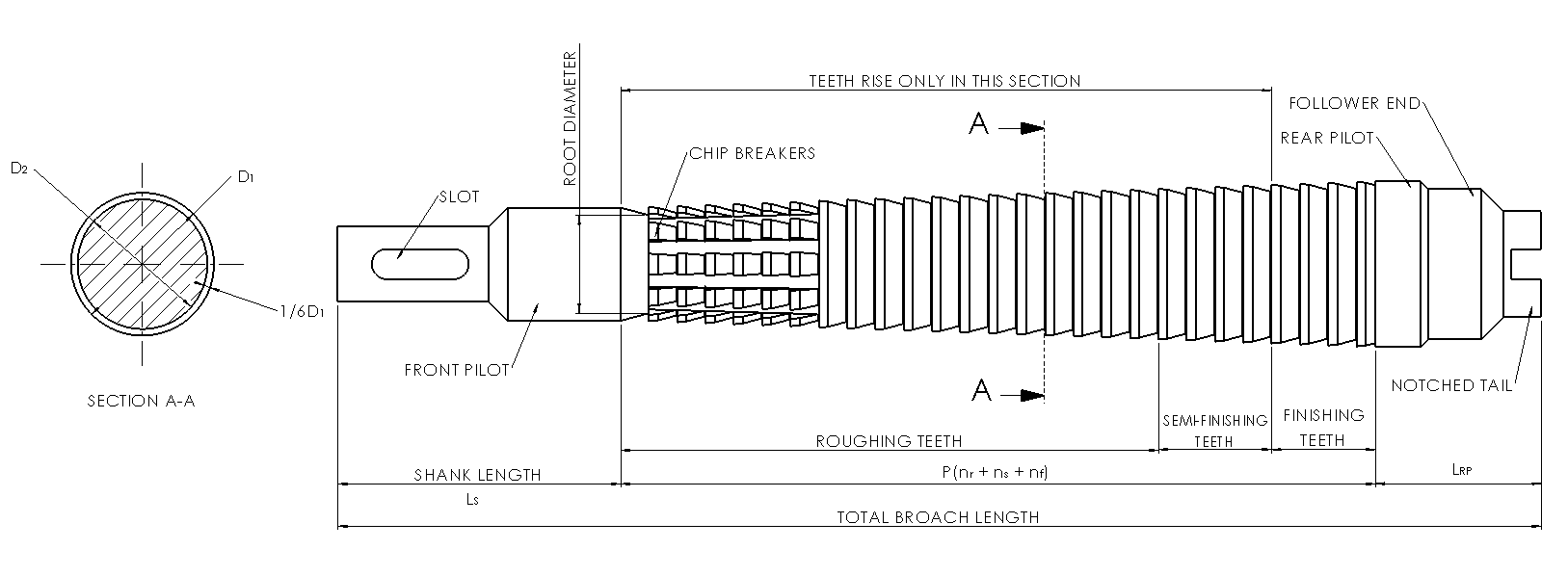

where:

- P = pitch
- RPT = rise per tooth
- n_{r} = number of roughing teeth
- n_{s} = number of semi-finishing teeth
- n_{f} = number of finishing teeth
- t_{r} = RPT for the roughing teeth
- t_{s} = RPT for the semi-finishing teeth
- t_{f} = RPT for the finishing teeth
- L_{s} = Shank length
- L_{RP} = Rear pilot length
- D_{1} = Diameter of the tooth tip
- D_{2} = Diameter of the tooth root
- D = Depth of a tooth (0.4P)
- L = Land (behind the cutting edge) (0.25P)
- R = Radius of the gullet (0.25P)
- α = Hook angle or rake angle
- γ = Back-off angle or clearance angle
- L_{w} = Length of the workpiece (not shown)

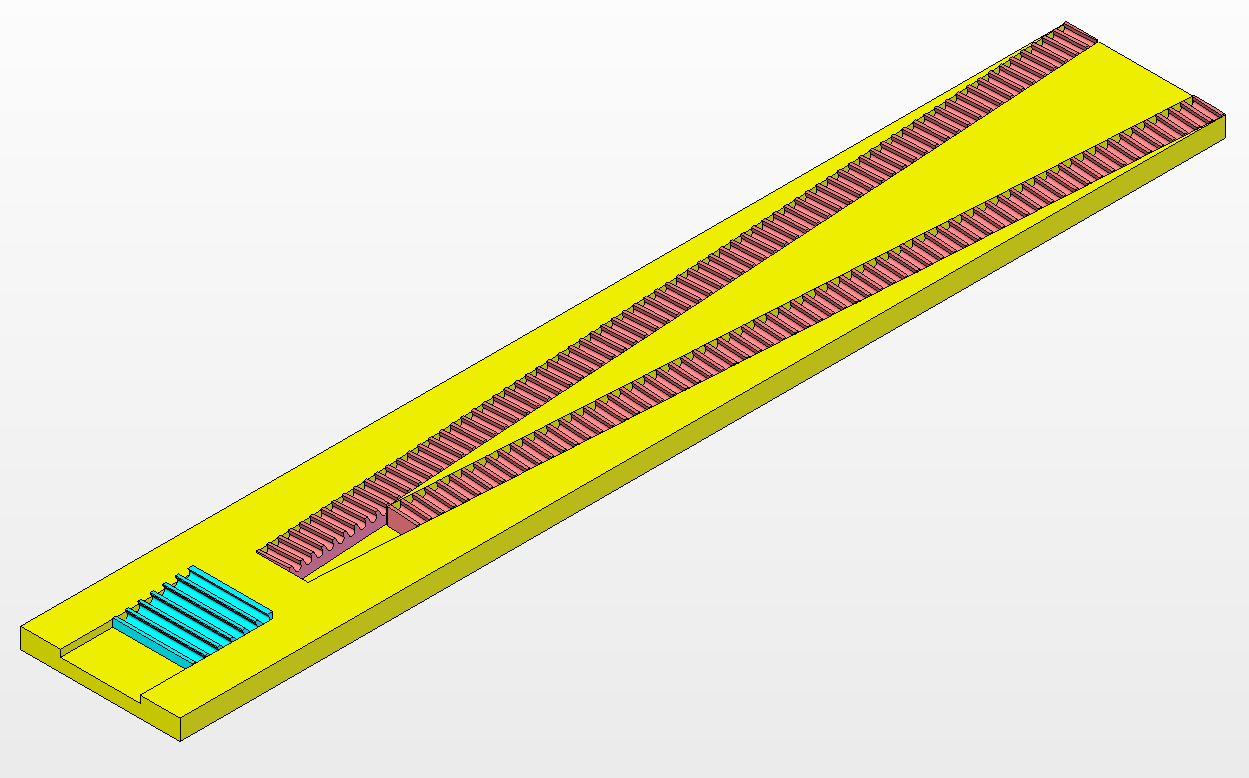
A progressive surface broach

The most important characteristic of a broach is the rise per tooth (RPT), which is how much material is removed by each tooth. The RPT varies for each section of the broach, which are the roughing section (t_{r}), semi-finishing section (t_{s}), and finishing section (t_{f}). The roughing teeth remove most of the material so the number of roughing teeth required dictates how long the broach is. The semi-finishing teeth provide surface finish and the finishing teeth provide the final finishing. The finishing section's RPT (t_{f}) is usually zero so that as the first finishing teeth wear the later ones continue the sizing function. For free-machining steels the RPT ranges from 0.006 to 0.001 in (0.152 to 0.025 mm). For surface broaching the RPT is usually between 0.003 to 0.006 in (0.076 to 0.152 mm) and for diameter broaching is usually between 0.0012 to 0.0025 in (0.030 to 0.064 mm). The exact value depends on many factors. If the cut is too big it will impart too much stress into the teeth and the workpiece; if the cut is too small the teeth rub instead of cutting. One way to increase the RPT while keeping the stresses down is with chip breakers. They are notches in the teeth designed to break the chip and decrease the overall amount of material being removed by any given tooth (see the drawing above). For broaching to be effective, the workpiece should have 0.020 to 0.025 in (0.51 to 0.64 mm) more material than the final dimension of the cut.

The hook (α) angle is a parameter of the material being cut. For steel, it is between 15 and 20° and for cast iron it is between 6 and 8°. The back-off (γ) provides clearance for the teeth so that they don't rub on the workpiece; it is usually between 1 and 3°.

When radially broaching workpieces that require a deep cut per tooth, such as forgings or castings, a rotor-cut or jump-cut design can be used; these broaches are also known as free egress or nibbling broaches. In this design the RPT is designated to two or three rows of teeth. For the broach to work the first tooth of that cluster has a wide notch, or undercut, and then the next tooth has a smaller notch (in a three tooth design) and the final tooth has no notch. This allows for a deep cut while keeping stresses, forces, and power requirements low.

There are two different options for achieving the same goal when broaching a flat surface. The first is similar to the rotor-cut design, which is known as a double-cut design. Here four teeth in a row have the same RPT, but each progressive tooth takes only a portion of the cut due to notches in the teeth (see the image gallery below). The other option is known as a progressive broach, which completely machines the center of the workpiece and then the rest of the broach machines outward from there. All of these designs require a broach that is longer than if a standard design were used.

For some circular broaches, burnishing teeth are provided instead of finishing teeth. They are not really teeth, as they are just rounded discs that are 0.001 to 0.003 in (0.025 to 0.076 mm) oversized. This results in burnishing the hole to the proper size. This is primarily used on non-ferrous and cast iron workpieces.

The pitch defines the tooth construction, strength, and number of teeth in contact with the workpiece. The pitch is usually calculated from workpiece length, so that the broach can be designed to have at least two teeth in contact with the workpiece at any time; the pitch remains constant for all teeth of the broach. One way to calculate the pitch is:

$$P \cong 0.35 \sqrt{L_\mathrm w}$$

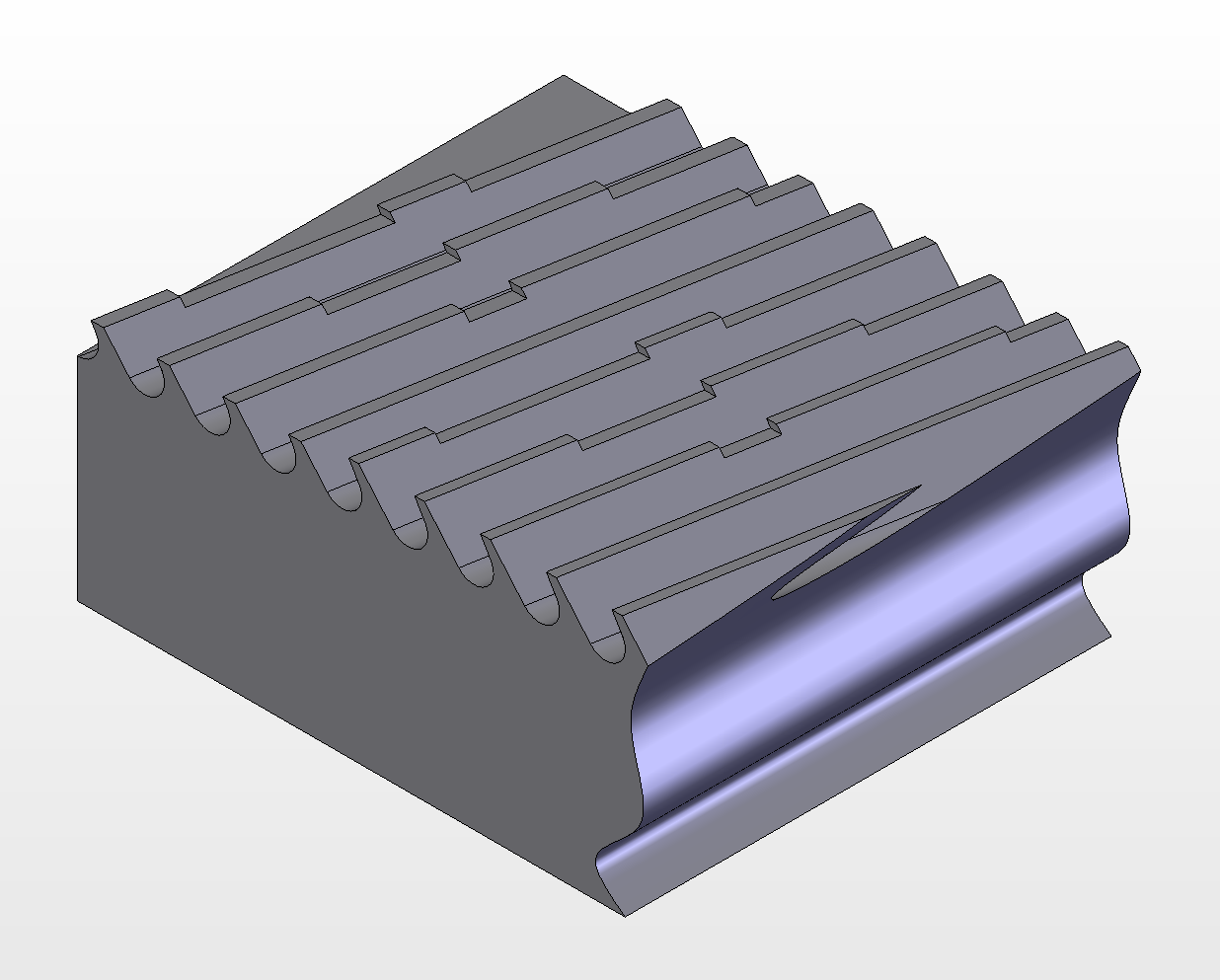
Example of a double-cut surface broach

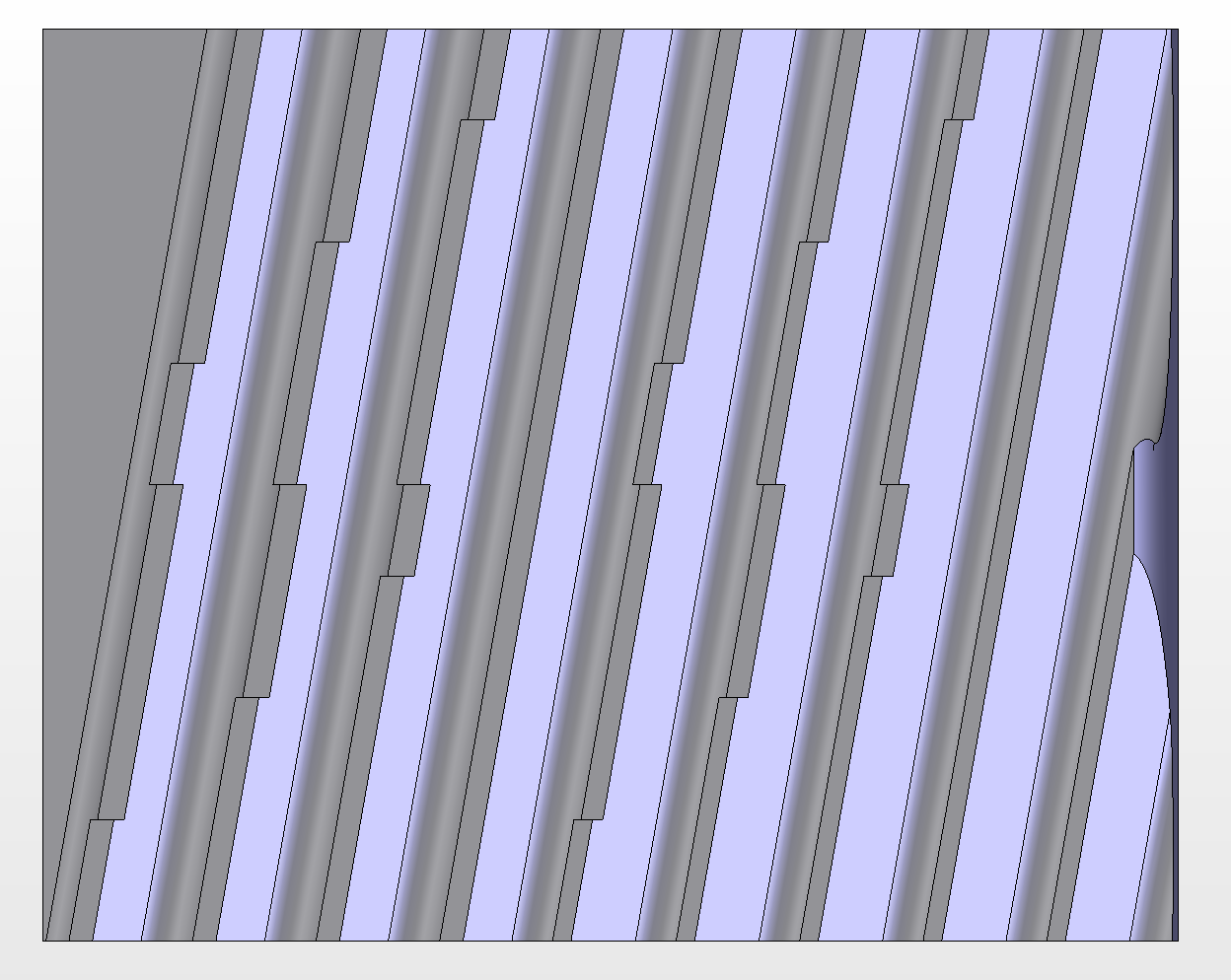
Top view of a double-cut surface broach

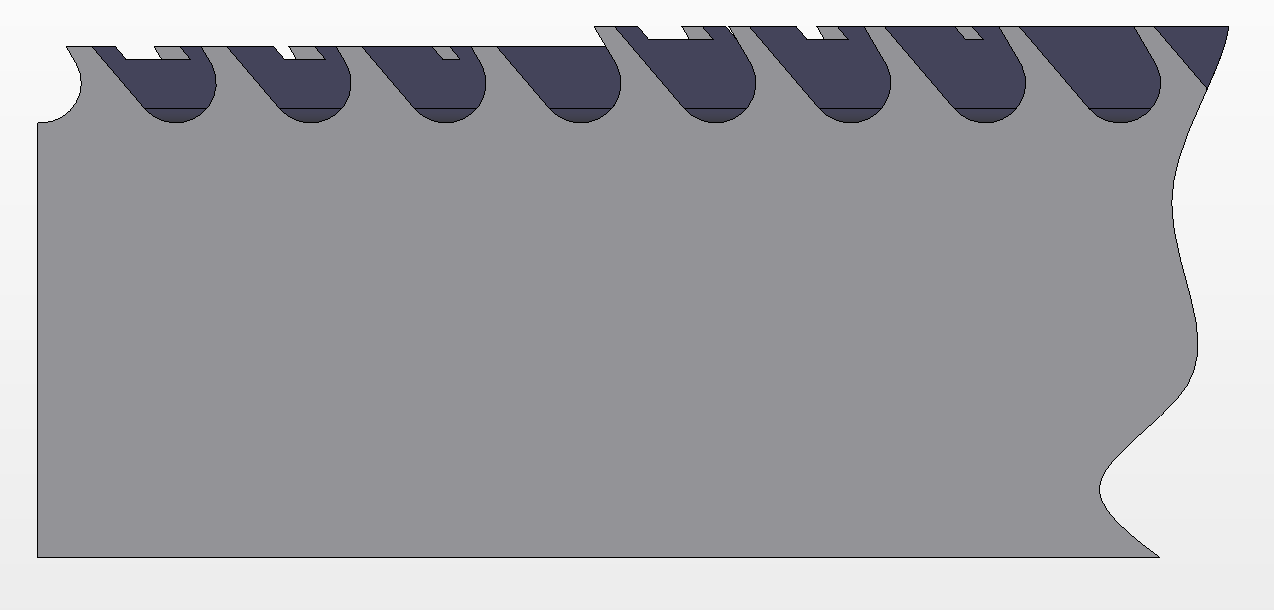
Side view of a double-cut surface broach

== Broaching machines ==
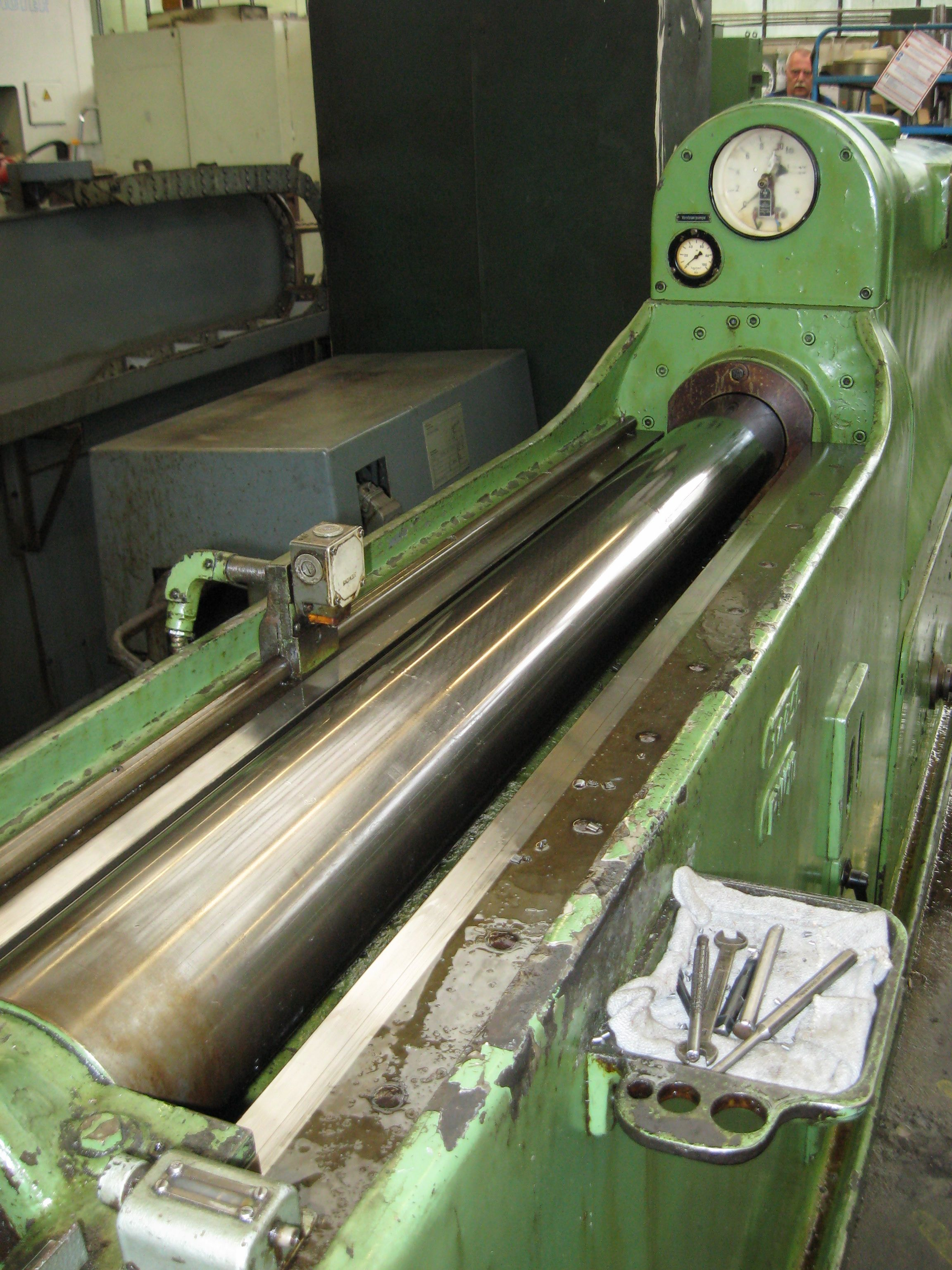
The hydraulic cylinder of a horizontal broaching machine

Broaching machines are relatively simple as they only have to move the broach in a linear motion at a predetermined speed and provide a means for handling the broach automatically. Most machines are hydraulic, but a few specialty machines are mechanically driven. The machines are distinguished by whether their motion is horizontal or vertical. The choice of machine is primarily dictated by the stroke required. Vertical broaching machines rarely have a stroke longer than 60 in (1.5 m).

Vertical broaching machines can be designed for push broaching, pull-down broaching, pull-up broaching, or surface broaching. Push broaching machines are similar to an arbor press with a guided ram; typical capacities are 5 to 50 tons. The two ram pull-down machine is the most common type of broaching machine. This style machine has the rams under the table. Pull-up machines have the ram above the table; they usually have more than one ram. Most surface broaching is done on a vertical machine.

Horizontal broaching machines are designed for pull broaching, surface broaching, continuous broaching, and rotary broaching. Pull style machines are basically vertical machines laid on the side with a longer stroke. Surface style machines hold the broach stationary while the workpieces are clamped into fixtures that are mounted on a conveyor system. Continuous style machines are similar to the surface style machines except adapted for internal broaching.

Horizontal machines used to be much more common than vertical machines; however, today they represent just 10% of all broaching machines purchased. Vertical machines are more popular because they take up less space.

Broaching is often impossible without the specific broaching or keyway machines unless you have a system that can be used in conjunction with a modern machining centre or driven tooling lathe; these extra bits of equipment open up the possibility of producing keyways, splines and Torx through one-hit machining.

== Rotary broaching ==
Schematic of a rotary broach starting a cut.: θ / Off-axis (wobble) angle; θ_{r} / Rake; θ_{f} / Front relief; d_{p} / Pilot diameter; w / Width across corners (AC)

A somewhat different design of cutting tool that can achieve the irregular hole or outer profile of a broach is called a rotary broach or wobble broach. One of the biggest advantages to this type of broaching is that it does not require a broaching machine, but instead is used on lathes, milling machines, screw machines or Swiss lathes.

Rotary broaching requires two tooling components: a tool holder and a broach. The leading (cutting) edge of the broach has a contour matching the desired final shape. The broach is mounted in a special tool holder that allows it to freely rotate. The tool holder is special because it holds the tool so that its axis of rotation is inclined slightly to the axis of rotation of the work. A typical value for this misalignment is 1°. This angle is what produces a rotating edge for the broach to cut the workpiece. Either the workpiece or the tool holder is rotated. If the tool holder is rotated, the misalignment causes the broach to appear as though it is "wobbling", which is the origin of the term wobble broach.

For internal broaching the sides of the broach are drafted inward so it becomes thinner; for external broaching the sides are drafted outward, to make the pocket bigger. This draft keeps the broach from jamming; the draft must be larger than the angle of misalignment. If the work piece rotates, the broach is pressed against it, is driven by it, and rotates synchronously with it. If the tool holder rotates, the broach is pressed against the workpiece, but is driven by the tool holder.

Ideally the tool advances at the same rate that it cuts. The ideal rate of cut is defined as:

Rate of cut [inches per rotation (IPR)] = (diameter of tool [inches]) × sin(Angle of misalignment [degrees])

If it advances much faster, then the tool becomes choked; conversely, if it advances much slower, then an interrupted or zig-zag cut occurs. In practice the rate of cut is slightly less than the ideal rate so that the load is released on the non-cutting edge of the tool.

There is some spiraling of the tool as it cuts, so the form at the bottom of the workpiece may be rotated with respect to the form at the top of the hole or profile. Spiraling may be undesirable because it binds the body of the tool and prevents it from cutting sharply. One solution to this is to reverse the rotation in mid cut, causing the tool to spiral in the opposite direction. If reversing the machine is not practical, then interrupting the cut is another possible solution.

In general, a rotary broach will not cut as accurately as a push or pull broach. However, the ability to use this type of cutting tool on common machine tools is highly advantageous. In addition, push or pull broaches cannot be used in a blind hole, while a rotary broach can, as long as there is sufficient space for chips at the bottom of the hole.

== See also ==
- Reamer
