= End mill =

Milling cutter designed to cut axially

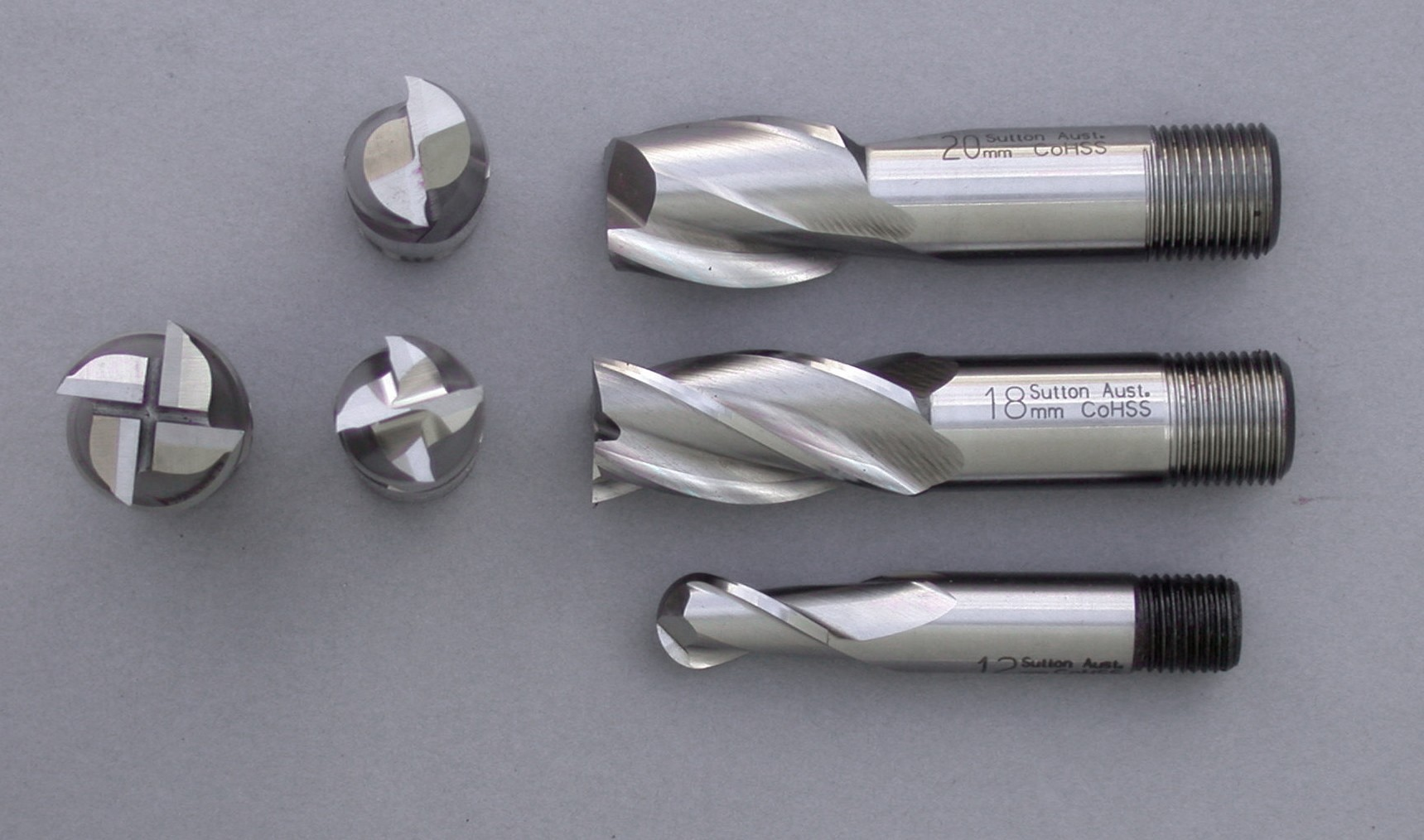
Several types of end mills

An end mill is a type of milling cutter, a cutting tool used in industrial milling applications. They can have several end configurations: round (ball), tapered, or straight are a few popular types. They are most commonly used in "milling machines" that move a piece of material against the end mill to remove chips of the material to create a desired size or shape. It is distinguished from the drill bit in its application, geometry, and manufacture. While a drill bit can only cut in the axial direction, most milling bits can cut in the radial direction. Not all milling tools can cut tangentially: those designed to do so are known as end mills.

End mills are used in milling applications such as profile milling, tracer milling, face milling, and plunging.

== Types ==
Several broad categories of end- and face-milling tools exist, such as center-cutting versus non-center-cutting (whether the mill can take full-width plunging cuts); and categorization by number of flutes; by helix angle; by material; and by coating material. Each category may be further divided by specific application and special geometry. Additional milling application categories include, woodworking, automotive manufacturing and customization, and all types of machining.

A very popular helix angle, especially for general cutting of metal materials, is 30°. For finishing end mills, it is common to see more tight spiral, with helix angles 45° or 60°. Straight flute end mills (helix angle 0°) are used in special applications, like milling plastics or composites of epoxy and glass. Straight flute end mills were also used historically for metal cutting before invention of helical flute end mill by Carl A. Bergstrom of Weldon Tool Company in 1918.

There exist end mills with variable flute helix or pseudo-random helix angle, and discontinuous flute geometries, to help break material into smaller pieces while cutting (improving chip evacuation and reducing risk of jamming) and reduce tool engagement on big cuts. Some modern designs also include small features like the corner chamfer and chipbreaker. While more expensive, due to more complex design and manufacturing process, such end mills can last longer due to less wear and improve productivity in high speed machining (HSM) applications.

It is becoming increasingly common for traditional solid end mills to be replaced by more cost-effective inserted cutting tools (which, though more expensive initially, reduce tool-change times and allow for the easy replacement of worn or broken cutting edges rather than the entire tool). Another advantage of indexable end mills(another term for tools with inserts) is their ability to be flexible with what materials they can work on, rather than being specialized for a certain material type like more traditional end mills. For the time being however, this only generally applies to larger diameter end mills, at or above 3/4 of an inch. These end mills are generally used for roughing operation, whereas traditional end mills are still used for finishing and work where a smaller diameter, or a tighter tolerance, are required; modular tooling introduces additional margins of error that can compound with each new component, whereas a solid tool can provide a smaller tolerance range for the same price level.

End mills are sold in both imperial and metric shank and cutting diameters. In the USA, metric is readily available, but it is only used in some machine shops and not others; in Canada, due to the country's proximity to the US, much the same is true. In Asia and Europe, metric diameters are standard.

== Geometry ==
A variety of grooves, slots, and pockets in the work-piece may be produced from a variety of tool bits. Common tool bit types are: square end cutters, ball end cutters, t-slot cutters, and shell mills. Square end cutters can mill square slots, pockets, and edges. Ball end cutters mill radiused slots or fillets. T-slot cutters mill exactly that: T-shaped slots. Shell end cutters are used for large flat surfaces and for angle cuts. There are variations of these tool types as well.

There are four critical angles of each cutting tool: end cutting edge angle, axial relief angle, radial relief angle, and radial rake angle.

Depending on the material being milled, and what task should be performed, different tool types and geometry may be used. For instance, when milling a material like aluminum, it may be advantageous to use a tool with very deep, polished flutes, a very sharp cutting edge and high rake angles. When machining a tough material such as stainless steel, however, shallow flutes and a squared-off cutting edge will optimize material removal and tool life.

A wide variety of materials are used to produce the cutting tools. Carbide inserts are the most common because they are good for high production milling. High speed steel is commonly used when a special tool shape is needed, not usually used for high production processes. Ceramics inserts are typically used in high speed machining with high production. Diamond inserts are typically used on products that require tight tolerances, typically consisting of high surface qualities (nonferrous or non-metallic materials).

In the early 90s, use of coatings became more common. Coatings can provide various benefits including wear resistance, reduction of friction to assist with chip evacuation, and increased heat resistance. Most of these coatings are referred to by their chemical composition.

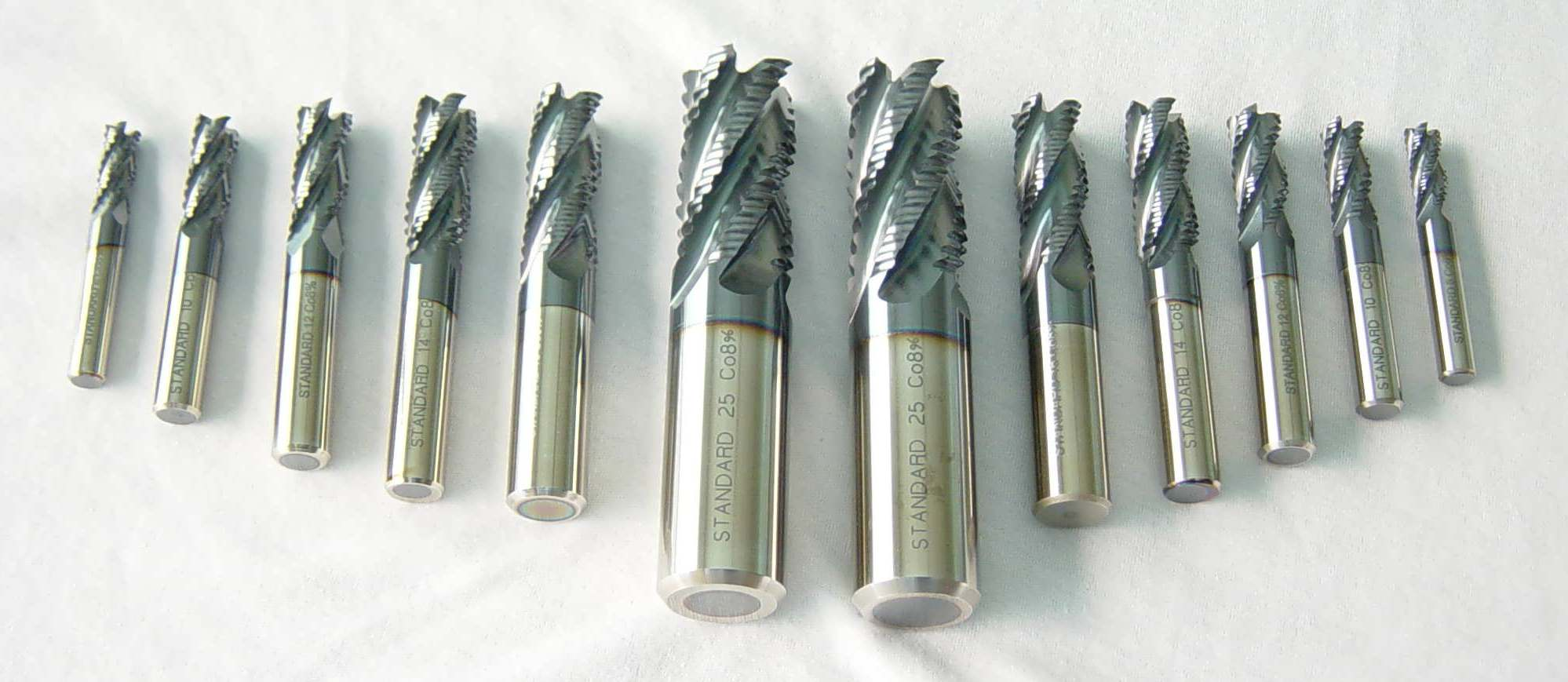
Aluminum titanium nitride (AlTiN) coated end mills, coated using the cathodic arc deposition technique

Common End Mill Coatings
Coating	Appearance	Remarks
TiN	Yellow/Gold	A basic coating that has fallen out of wide use on end mills. Still sees wide use in drills.
TiCN	Bluish-grey	
TiAlN and AlTiN	Dark grey or dark purple	An extremely popular coating.
TiAlCrN, AlTiCrN and AlCrTiN	Bluish-grey	A PVD coating

Though PCD veins is not a coating, some end mills are manufactured with a 'vein' of polycrystalline diamond. The vein is formed in a high temperature-high pressure environment. The vein is formed in a blank and then the material is ground out along the vein to form the cutting edge. Although the tools can be very costly, they can last many times longer than other tooling.

Advances in end mill coatings are being made, however, with coatings such as Amorphous Diamond and nanocomposite PVD coatings beginning to be seen at high-end shops (as of 2004).

Although coatings have a typical color, manufacturers may modify the coating process or add additives to change the appearance without affecting the performance as part of their branding. Bright blues, reds and turquoise are among the "unnatural" colors.

End mills are typically made on CNC (computer numeric controlled) tool and cutter grinder machines under high-pressure lubricants such as water, water-soluble oil, and high-flashpoint oil. Grinding inside the machine is accomplished with abrasive wheels mounted on a spindle (and in some cases, multiple spindles). Depending on what material is being ground, these wheels are made with industrial diamond (when grinding tungsten carbide), cubic boron nitride (when grinding cobalt steel), and other materials (when grinding, for instance, ceramics), set in a bond (sometimes copper).

== Operations ==
Roughing: generally the purpose of roughing to remove most of the material and get close to the finish shape and size. By definition, the roughing cuts will happen first and be followed by semi-finish and/or finish cuts.

Contouring/Profiling: this is a process used to mill different surfaces such as flat or irregular ones. This type of process can be done during the roughing or finishing phase of the overall operation.

Facing: is an operation used to face the part down to specified dimension. Facing can be done using end mills or a special face mill.

Pocketing/Slotting: this is a process to make a pocket on the inside of the part. A pocket can be shallow or deep, depending on specs.

== See also ==
- Burr (cutter)
- CNC pocket milling
