= Ion beam deposition =

Ion beam deposition (IBD) is a process of applying materials to a target through the application of an ion beam.

Ion beam deposition setup with mass separator

An ion beam deposition apparatus typically consists of an ion source, ion optics, and the deposition target. Optionally a mass analyzer can be incorporated.

In the ion source source materials in the form of a gas, an evaporated solid, or a solution (liquid) are ionized. For atomic IBD, electron ionization, field ionization (Penning ion source) or cathodic arc sources are employed. Cathodic arc sources are used particularly for carbon ion deposition. Molecular ion beam deposition employs electrospray ionization or MALDI sources.

The ions are then accelerated, focused or deflected using high voltages or magnetic fields. Optional deceleration at the substrate can be employed to define the deposition energy. This energy usually ranges from a few eV up to a few keV. At low energy molecular ion beams are deposited intact (ion soft landing), while at a high deposition energy molecular ions fragment and atomic ions can penetrate further into the material, a process known as ion implantation.

Ion optics (such as radio frequency quadrupoles) can be mass selective. In IBD they are used to select a single, or a range of ion species for deposition in order to avoid contamination. For organic materials in particular, this process is often monitored by a mass spectrometer.

The ion beam current, which is quantitative measure for the deposited amount of material, can be monitored during the deposition process. Switching of the selected mass range can be used to define a stoichiometry.

The main disadvantages of ion beam sputtering are its small target area, low deposition rate, and difficulty in depositing large-area films with uniform thickness. Additionally, the equipment is complex and has high operating costs. These limitations make ion beam sputtering less efficient for large-scale applications.

== See also ==
- Cathodic arc deposition
- Sputter deposition
- Ion beam assisted deposition
- Ion beam induced deposition
