= Titanium aluminium nitride =

Group of metastable hard coatings

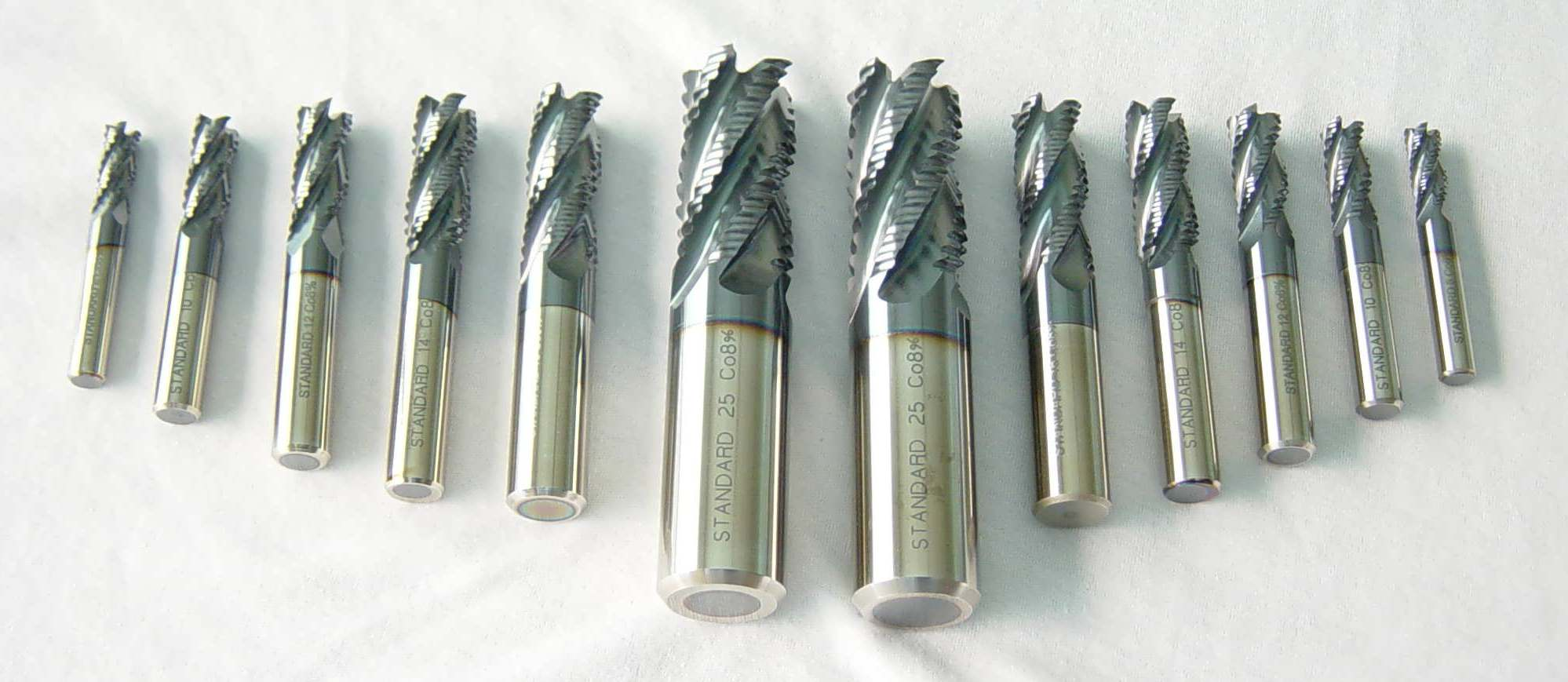
Aluminium titanium nitride (AlTiN) coated endmills using cathodic arc deposition technique

Titanium aluminium nitride (TiAlN) or aluminium titanium nitride (AlTiN; for aluminium contents higher than 50%) is a group of metastable hard coatings consisting of nitrogen and the metallic elements aluminium and titanium. This compound as well as similar compounds(such as TiN and TiCN) are most notably used for coating machine tools such and endmills and drills to change their properties, such as increased thermal stability and/or wear resistance. Four important compositions (metal content 100 wt.%) are deposited in industrial scale by physical vapor deposition methods:

- Ti50Al50N (industrially introduced by the company CemeCoat (now CemeCon) Aachen, BRD, group T. Leydecker ca. 1989)
- Al55Ti45N (industrially introduced by the company Metaplas Ionon (now Oerlikon), Bergisch Gladbach, BRD, group J. Vetter ca. 1999)
- Al60Ti40N (industrially introduced by the company Kobe Steel, Kobe, Japan, ca. 1992)
- Al66Ti34N (industrially introduced by the company Metaplas (now Oerlikon) group J. Vetter ca. 1996).

The fundamental reasons why TiAlN coatings outperform pure Titanium nitride (TiN) coatings are considered to be:

- Increased oxidation resistance at elevated temperatures due to the formation of a protective aluminium-oxide layer at the surface
- Increased hardness in the freshly deposited films due to micro-structure changes and solid solution hardening
- Age hardening of the coatings at temperatures typical for cutting tools operation due to spinodal decomposition of TiAlN into TiN and cubic AlN

The age hardening phenomenon has been shown to originate in a mismatch in the quantum mechanical electronic structure of TiN and AlN.

The coatings are mostly deposited by cathodic arc deposition or magnetron sputtering. Even though most TiAlN and AlTiN coatings are industrially synthesized using alloy targets with specific percentages of aluminium and titanium it is possible to produce TiAlN coatings with pure Al and Ti targets using a cathodic arc deposition technique. TiAlN and AlTiN coatings from pure Al and pure Ti targets by Cathodic arc deposition have been produced industrially by NanoShield PVD Thailand since 1999. By using separate target technology it is possible to offer more flexibility regarding the structure and composition of the coating.

Selected properties of Al66Ti34N are:

- Vickers hardness 2600 to 3300 HV.
- Phase stability ca. 850 °C, start of decomposition to AlN+TiN.
- Intense oxidation starts at about 800 °C (ca. 300 °C higher than for TiN).
- Lower electrical and thermal conductivity than TiN
- Typical coating thickness ca. (1 to 7) μm

One commercial coating type used to improve the wear resistance of tungsten carbide tools is the AlTiN-Saturn from Sulzer Metaplas.

The coatings are sometimes doped with at least one of the elements carbon, silicon, boron, oxygen and yttrium in order to improve selected properties for specific applications. These coatings are also used to create multilayer systems. For example, they can be used in combination with TiSiXN like those used in the Mpower coating family of Sulzer Metaplas. The coating types mentioned above are applied to protect tools including special tools for medical applications. They are also used as decorative finishes.

One derivative of TiAlN coating technology is the nanocomposite TiAlSiN (titanium aluminium silicon nitride) which was developed by SHM in the Czech Republic and now marketed by Platit of Switzerland. The nanocomposite TiAlSiN coating exhibits superhard hardness and outstanding high temperature workability.
