= Titanium nitride =

Ceramic material

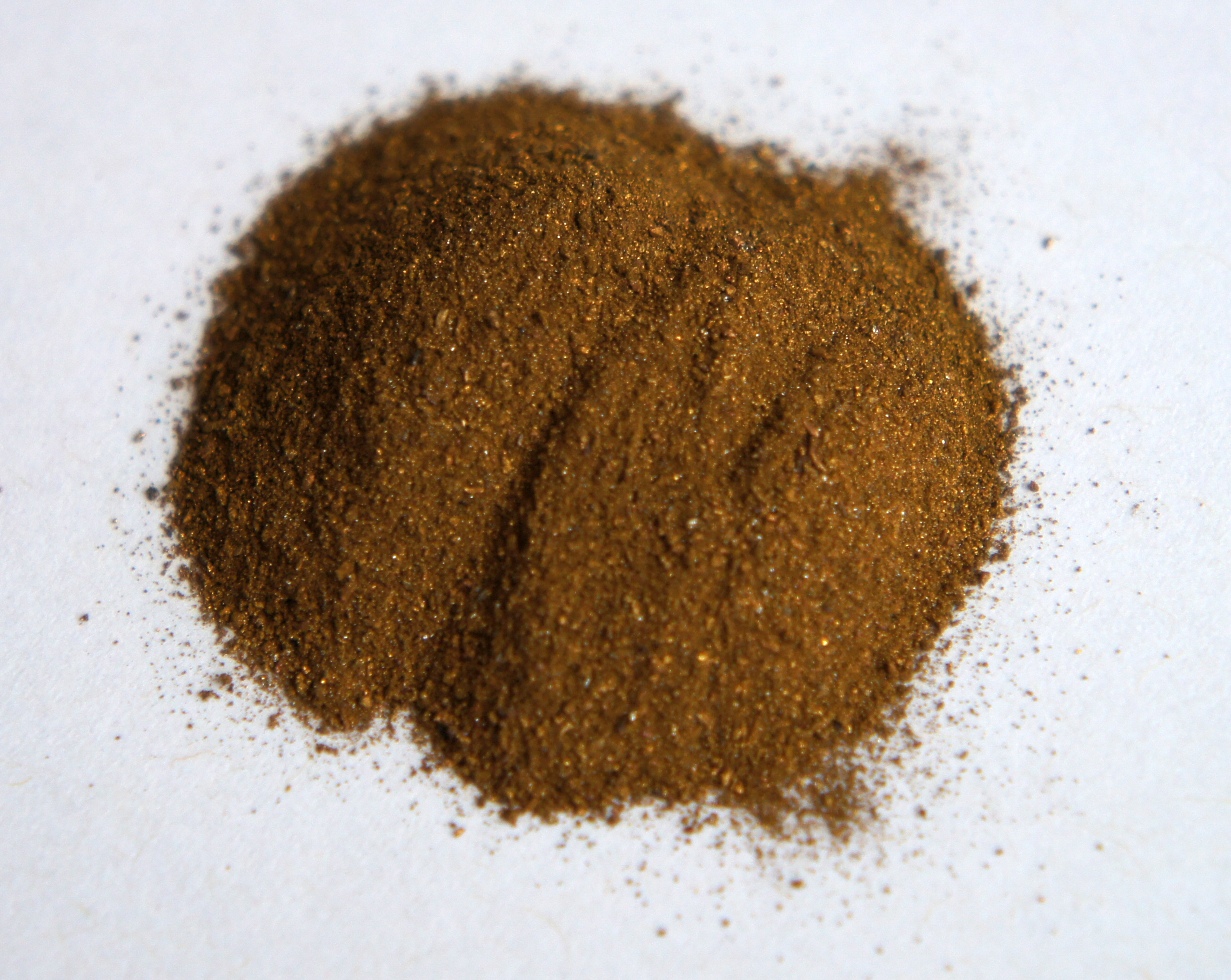

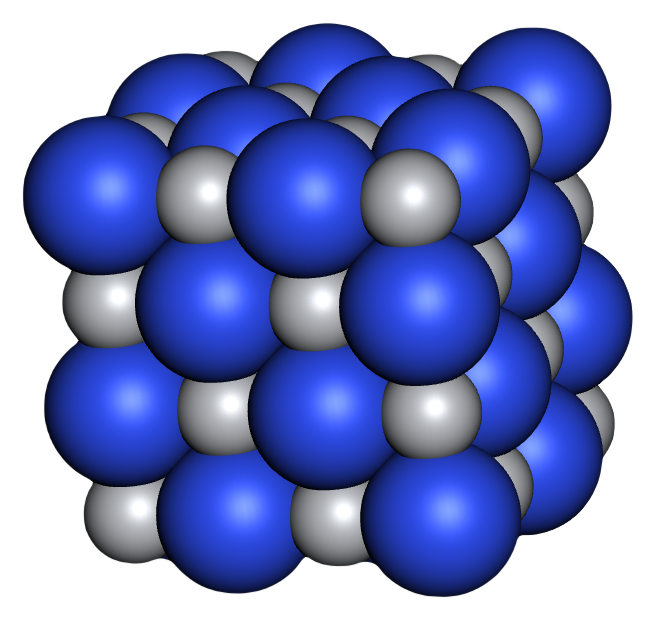

Names
- IUPAC name Titanium nitride
- Other names Titanium(III) nitride

Identifiers
CAS Number	25583-20-4
3D model (JSmol)	Interactive image
ChemSpider	84040
ECHA InfoCard	100.042.819
EC Number	247-117-5
PubChem CID	93091
UNII	6RW464FEFF
CompTox Dashboard (EPA)	DTXSID8067109
- InChI: InChI=1S/N.Ti
- SMILES: N#[Ti]

Properties
Chemical formula	TiN
Molar mass	61.874 g/mol
Appearance	Brown as a pure solid, coating of golden color
Odor	Odorless
Density	5.21 g/cm^{3}
Melting point	2,947 °C (5,337 °F; 3,220 K)
Solubility in water	insoluble
Magnetic susceptibility (χ)	+38×10^{−6} emu/mol
Thermal conductivity	29 W/(m·K) (323 K)

Structure
Crystal structure	Face-centered cubic (FCC), cF8
Space group	Fm3̅m, No. 225
Lattice constant	a = 0.4241 nm
Formula units (Z)	4
Coordination geometry	Octahedral

Thermochemistry
Heat capacity (C)	24 J/(K·mol) (500 K)
Std molar entropy (S^{⦵}_{298})	−95.7 J/(K·mol)
Std enthalpy of formation (Δ_{f}H^{⦵}_{298})	−336 kJ/mol

Related compounds
Related coating	Titanium aluminum nitride
- Except where otherwise noted, data are given for materials in their standard state (at 25 °C [77 °F], 100 kPa). verify (what is ?) Infobox references

Titanium nitride (TiN; sometimes known as tinite) is an extremely hard ceramic material, often used as a physical vapor deposition (PVD) coating on titanium alloys, steel, carbide, and aluminium components to improve the substrate's surface properties.

Applied as a thin coating, TiN is used to harden and protect cutting and sliding surfaces, for decorative purposes (for its golden appearance), and as a non-toxic exterior for medical implants. In most applications a coating of less than 5 micrometres (0.00020 in) is applied.

== Characteristics ==
TiN has a Vickers hardness of 1800–2100, hardness of 31±4 GPa, a modulus of elasticity of 550±50 GPa, a thermal expansion coefficient of 9.35×10^{−6} K^{−1}, and a superconducting transition temperature of 5.6 K.

TiN oxidizes at 800 °C in a normal atmosphere. It is chemically stable at 20 °C, according to laboratory tests, but can be slowly attacked by concentrated acid solutions with rising temperatures. TiN has a brown color and appears gold when applied as a coating. Depending on the substrate material and surface finish, TiN has a coefficient of friction ranging from 0.4 to 0.9 against another TiN surface (non-lubricated). The typical TiN formation has a crystal structure of NaCl type with a roughly 1:1 stoichiometry; TiN_{x} compounds with x ranging from 0.6 to 1.2 are, however, thermodynamically stable.

TiN becomes superconducting at cryogenic temperatures, with critical temperature up to 6.0 K for single crystals. Superconductivity in thin-film TiN has been studied extensively, with the superconducting properties strongly varying depending on sample preparation, up to complete suppression of superconductivity at a superconductor–insulator transition. A thin film of TiN was chilled to near absolute zero, converting it into the first known superinsulator, with resistance suddenly increasing by a factor of 100,000.

== Natural occurrence ==
Osbornite is a very rare natural form of titanium nitride, found almost exclusively in meteorites.

== Uses ==
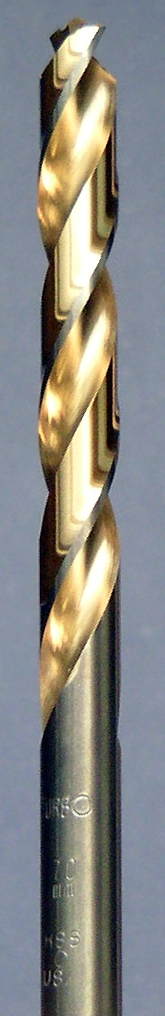
TiN-coated drill bit

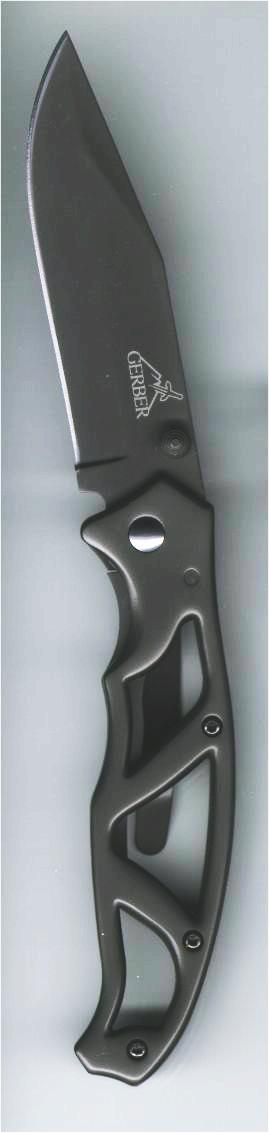
Dark gray TiCN coating on a Gerber pocketknife

A well-known use for TiN coating is for edge retention and corrosion resistance on machine tooling, such as drill bits and milling cutters, often improving their lifetime by a factor of three or more.

Because of the metallic gold color of TiN, this material is used to coat costume jewelry and automotive trim for decorative purposes. TiN is also widely used as a top-layer coating, usually with nickel- or chromium-plated substrates, on consumer plumbing fixtures and door hardware. As a coating, it is used in aerospace and military applications and to protect the sliding surfaces of suspension forks of bicycles and motorcycles, as well as the shock shafts of radio-controlled cars. TiN is also used as a protective coating on the moving parts of many rifles and semi-automatic firearms, as it is extremely durable. As well as being durable, it is also extremely smooth, making removing the carbon build-up extremely easy. TiN is non-toxic, meets FDA guidelines, and has seen use in medical devices such as scalpel blades and orthopedic bone-saw blades, where sharpness and edge retention are important. TiN coatings have also been used in implanted prostheses (especially hip replacement implants) and other medical implants.

Though less visible, thin films of TiN are also used in microelectronics, where they serve as a conductive connection between the active device and the metal contacts used to operate the circuit, while acting as a diffusion barrier to block the diffusion of the metal into the silicon. In this context, TiN is classified as a "barrier metal" (electrical resistivity ~ 39 μΩ·cm), even though it is clearly a ceramic from the perspective of chemistry or mechanical behavior. Recent chip design in the 45 nm technology and beyond also makes use of TiN as a "metal" for improved transistor performance. In combination with gate dielectrics (e.g. HfSiO_{4}) that have a higher permittivity compared to standard SiO_{2}, the gate length can be scaled down with low leakage, higher drive current and the same or better threshold voltage. Additionally, TiN thin films are currently under consideration for coating zirconium alloys for accident-tolerant nuclear fuels. It is also used as a coating on some compression driver diaphragms to improve performance.

Owing to their high biostability, TiN layers may also be used as electrodes in bioelectronic applications like in intelligent implants or in-vivo biosensors that have to withstand the severe corrosion caused by body fluids. TiN electrodes have already been applied in the subretinal prosthesis project as well as in biomedical microelectromechanical systems (BioMEMS).

== Fabrication ==
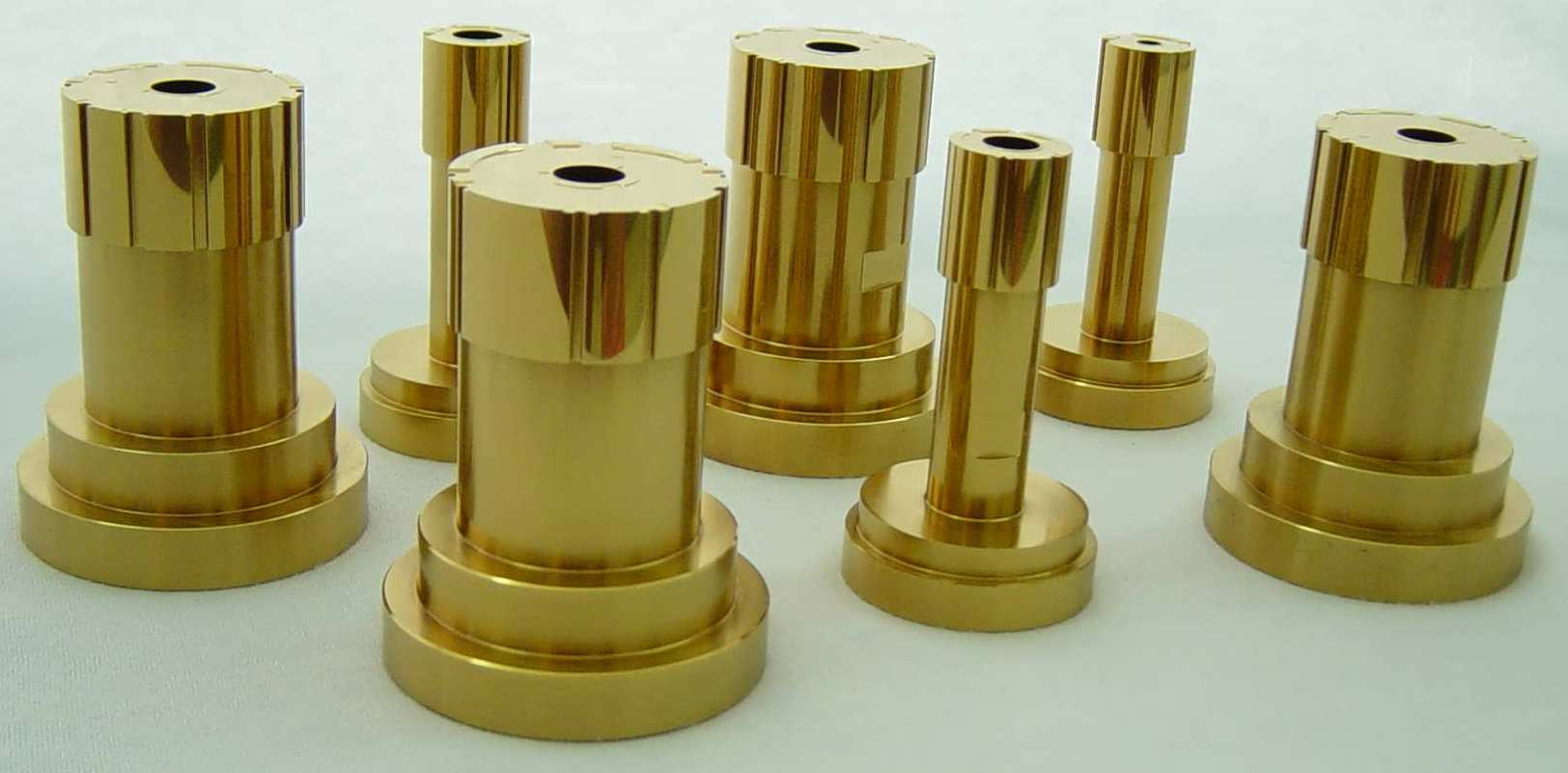
Punches TiN-coated using cathodic arc deposition technique

The most common methods of TiN thin film creation are physical vapor deposition (PVD, usually sputter deposition, cathodic arc deposition or electron-beam heating) and chemical vapor deposition (CVD). In both methods, pure titanium is sublimed and reacted with nitrogen in a high-energy, vacuum environment. TiN film may also be produced on Ti workpieces by reactive growth (for example, annealing) in a nitrogen atmosphere. PVD is preferred for steel parts because the deposition temperatures exceeds the austenitizing temperature of steel. TiN layers are also sputtered on a variety of higher-melting-point materials such as stainless steels, titanium and titanium alloys. Its high Young's modulus (values between 450 and 590 GPa have been reported in the literature) means that thick coatings tend to flake away, making them much less durable than thin ones. Titanium-nitride coatings can also be deposited by thermal spraying whereas TiN powders are produced by nitridation of titanium with nitrogen or ammonia at 1200 °C.

Bulk ceramic objects can be fabricated by packing powdered metallic titanium into the desired shape, compressing it to the proper density, then igniting it in an atmosphere of pure nitrogen. The heat released by the chemical reaction between the metal and gas is sufficient to sinter the nitride reaction product into a hard, finished item. See powder metallurgy.

== Other commercial variants ==
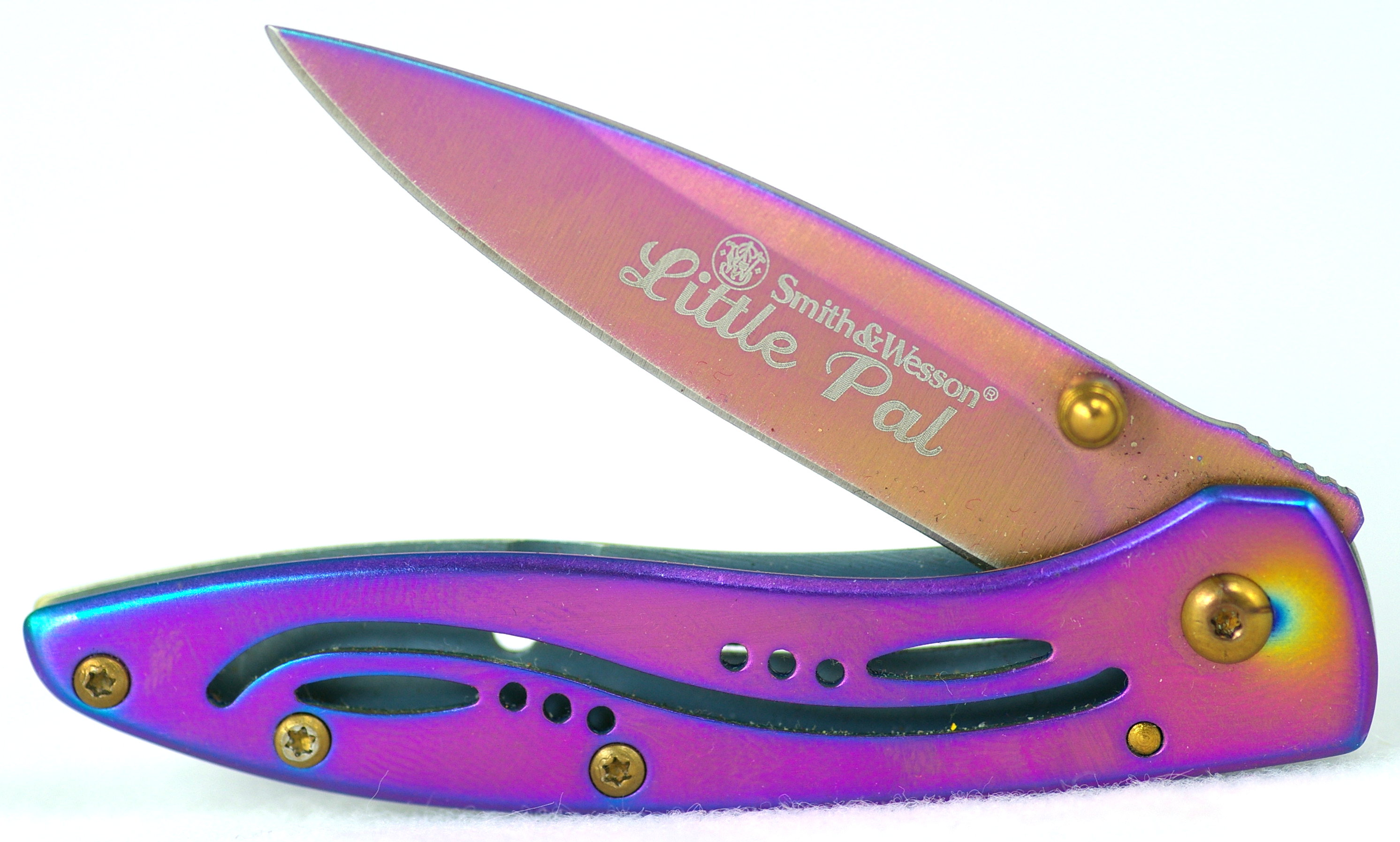
A knife with a titanium oxynitride coating

There are several commercially used variants of TiN that have been developed since 2010, such as titanium carbonitride (TiCN), titanium aluminium nitride (TiAlN or AlTiN), and titanium aluminum carbon nitride, which may be used individually or in alternating layers with TiN. These coatings offer similar or superior enhancements in corrosion resistance and hardness, and additional colors ranging from light gray to nearly black, to a dark, iridescent, bluish-purple, depending on the exact process of application. These coatings are becoming common on sporting goods, particularly knives and handguns, where they are used for both aesthetic and functional reasons.

== As a constituent in steel ==
Titanium nitride is also produced intentionally, within some steels, by judicious addition of titanium to the alloy. TiN forms at very high temperatures because of its very low enthalpy of formation, and even nucleates directly from the melt in secondary steel-making. It forms discrete, micrometre-sized cubic particles at grain boundaries and triple points, and prevents grain growth by Ostwald ripening up to very high homologous temperatures. Titanium nitride has the lowest solubility product of any metal nitride or carbide in austenite, a useful attribute in microalloyed steel formulas.
