= Cathodic arc deposition =

Type of physical vapor deposition technique

Cathodic arc deposition or Arc-PVD is a physical vapor deposition technique in which an electric arc is used to vaporize material from a cathode target. The vaporized material then condenses on a substrate, forming a thin film. The technique can be used to deposit metallic, ceramic, and composite films.

== History ==
Industrial use of modern cathodic arc deposition technology originated in Soviet Union around 1960–1970. By the late 1970s, Soviet government released the use of this technology to the West. Among many designs in USSR at that time the design by L. P. Sablev et al., was allowed to be used outside the USSR.

== Process ==
The arc evaporation process begins with the striking of a high current, low voltage arc on the surface of a cathode (known as the target) that gives rise to a small (usually a few micrometres wide), highly energetic emitting area known as a cathode spot. The localised temperature at the cathode spot is extremely high (around 15000 °C), which results in a high velocity (10 km/s) jet of vapourised cathode material, leaving a crater behind on the cathode surface. The cathode spot is only active for a short period of time, then it self-extinguishes and re-ignites in a new area close to the previous crater. This behaviour causes the apparent motion of the arc.

As the arc is basically a current carrying conductor it can be influenced by the application of an electromagnetic field, which in practice is used to rapidly move the arc over the entire surface of the target, so that the total surface is eroded over time.

The arc has an extremely high power density resulting in a high level of ionization (30-100%), multiple charged ions, neutral particles, clusters and macro-particles (droplets). If a reactive gas is introduced during the evaporation process, dissociation, ionization and excitation can occur during interaction with the ion flux and a compound film will be deposited.

One downside of the arc evaporation process is that if the cathode spot stays at an evaporative point for too long it can eject a large amount of macro-particles or droplets. These droplets are detrimental to the performance of the coating as they are poorly adhered and can extend through the coating. Worse still if the cathode target material has a low melting point such as aluminium the cathode spot can evaporate through the target resulting in either the target backing plate material being evaporated or cooling water entering the chamber. Therefore, magnetic fields as mentioned previously are used to control the motion of the arc. If cylindrical cathodes are used the cathodes can also be rotated during deposition. By not allowing the cathode spot to remain in one position too long aluminium targets can be used and the number of droplets is reduced. Some companies also use filtered arcs that use magnetic fields to separate the droplets from the coating flux.

== Equipment design ==
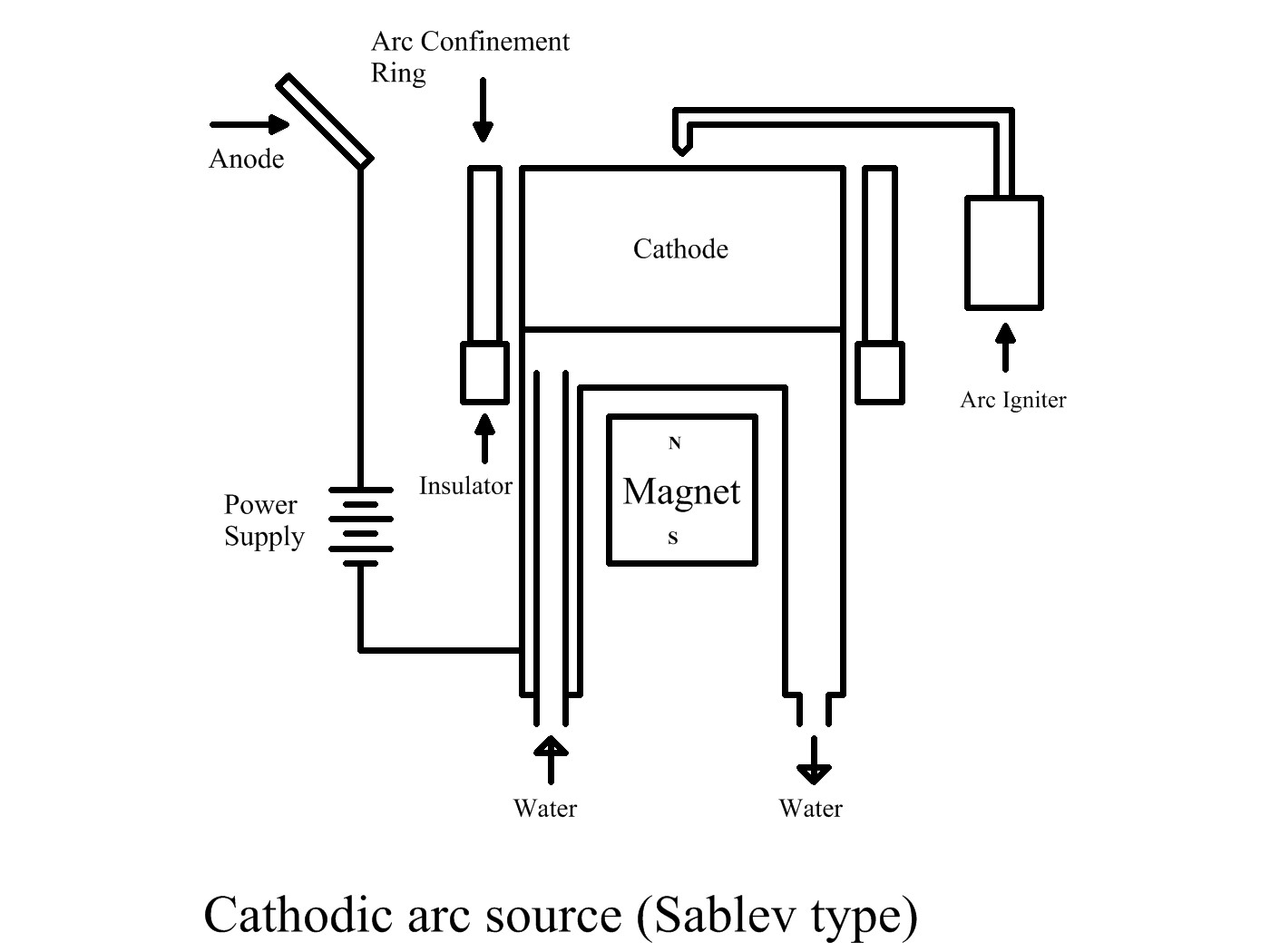
Sablev type Cathodic arc source with magnet to steer the movement of arc spot

A Sablev type Cathodic arc source, which is the most widely used in the West, consists of a short cylindrically shaped, electrically conductive target at the cathode with one open end. This target has an electrically-floating metal ring surrounding it, working as an arc confinement ring (Strel'nitskij shield). The anode for the system can be either the vacuum chamber wall or a discrete anode. Arc spots are generated by a mechanical trigger (or igniter) striking on the open end of the target making a temporary short circuit between the cathode and anode. After the arc spots are generated they can be steered by a magnetic field, or move randomly in absence of magnetic field.

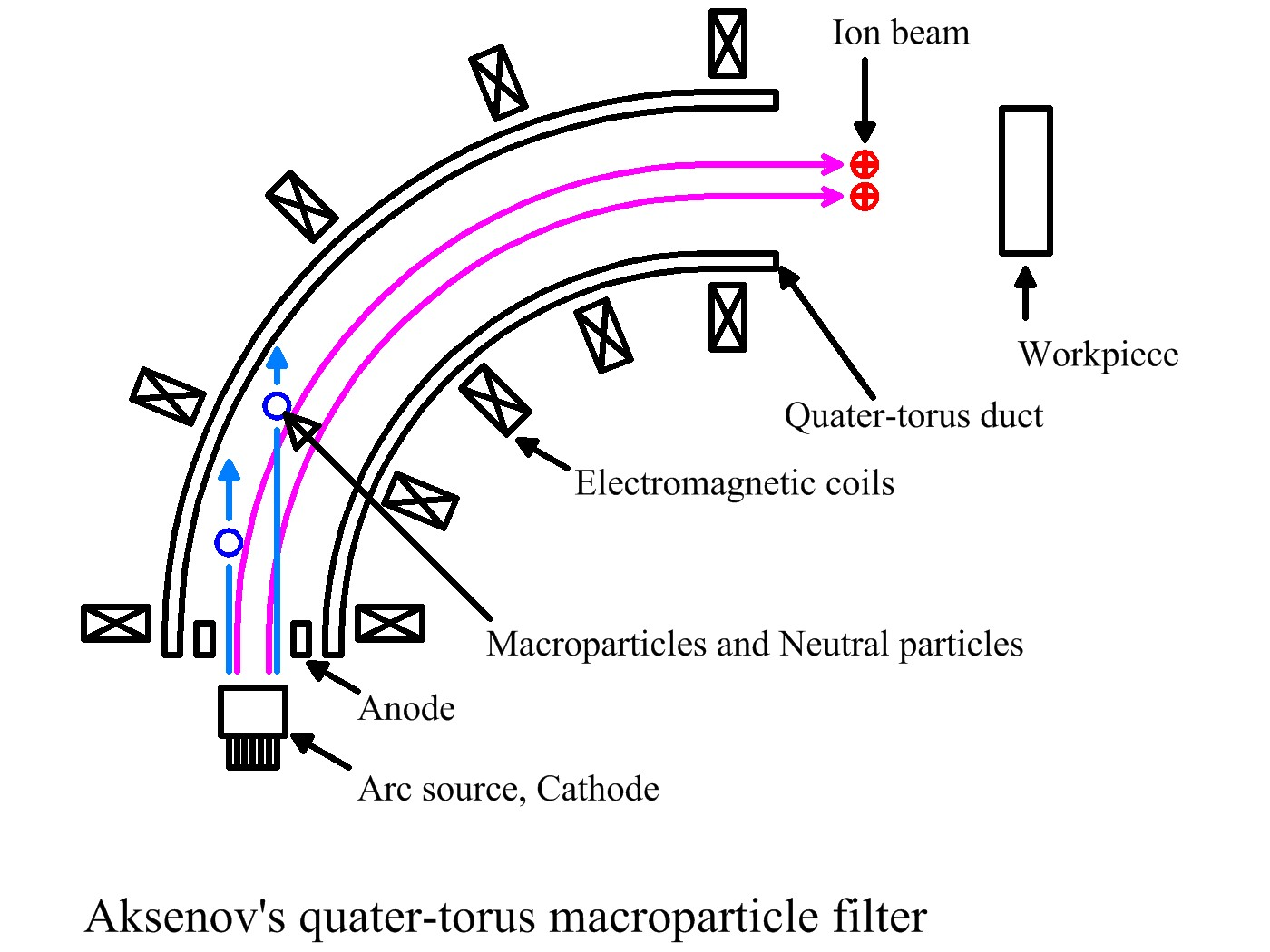
Aksenov Quarter-torus duct macroparticle filter using plasma optical principles which was developed by A. I. Morozov

The plasma beam from a Cathodic Arc source contains some larger clusters of atoms or molecules (so called macro-particles), which prevent it from being useful for some applications without some kind of filtering. There are many designs for macro-particle filters and the most studied design is based on the work by I. I. Aksenov et al. in 70's. It consists of a quarter-torus duct bent at 90 degrees from the arc source and the plasma is guided out of the duct by principle of plasma optics.

There are also other interesting designs, such as a design which incorporates a straight duct filter built-in with a truncated cone shaped cathode as reported by D. A. Karpov in the 1990s. This design became quite popular among both the thin hard-film coaters and researchers in Russia and former USSR countries until now. Cathodic arc sources can be made into a long tubular shape (extended-arc) or a long rectangular shape, but both designs are less popular.

== Applications ==
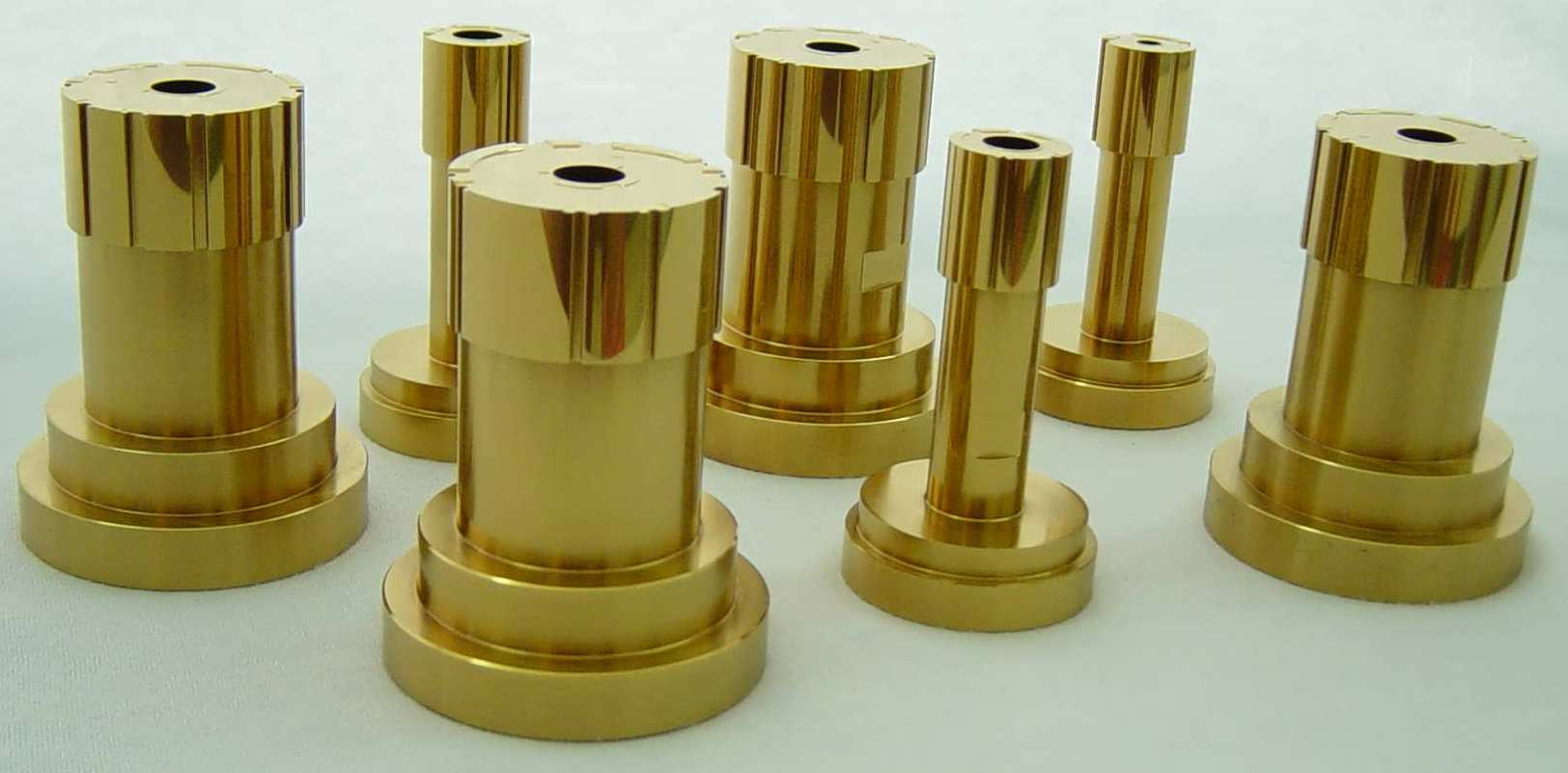
Titanium Nitride (TiN) coated punches using Cathodic arc deposition technique

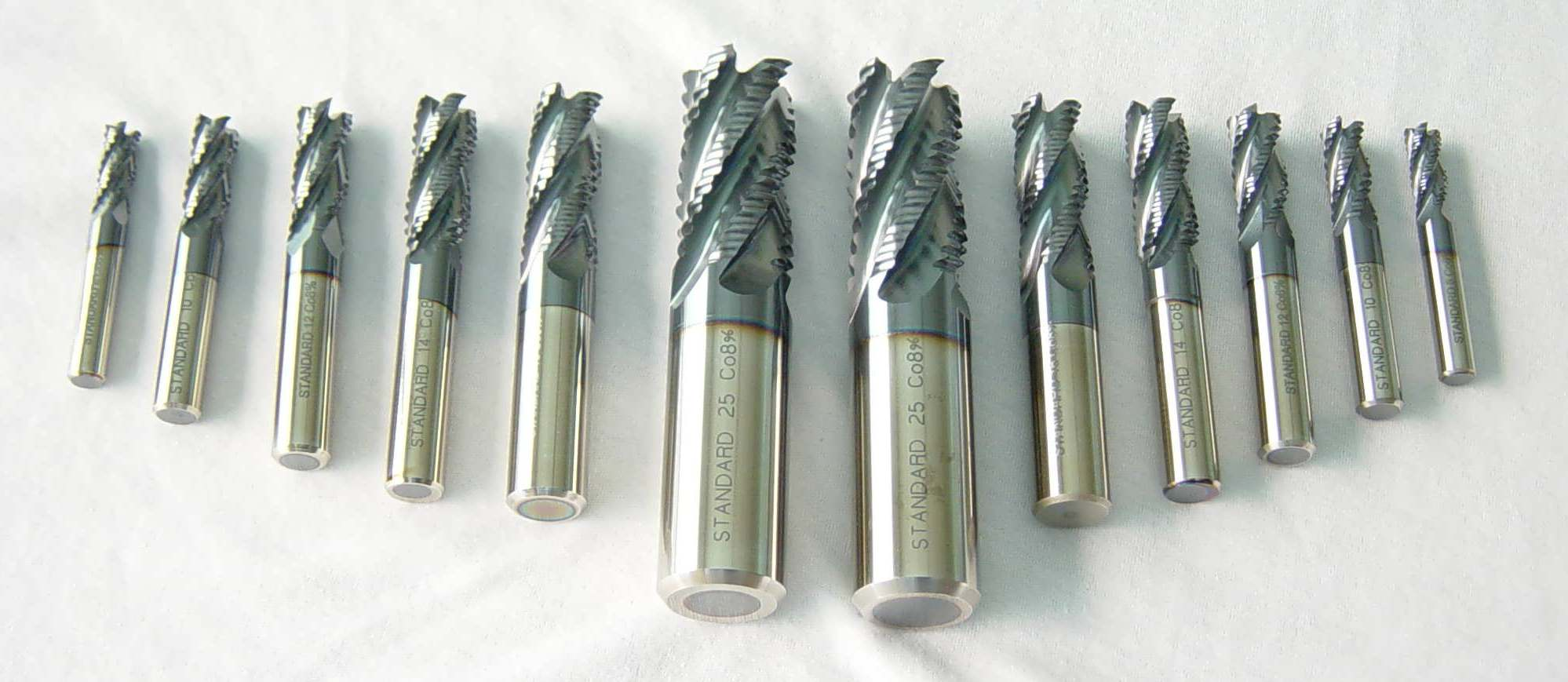
Aluminium Titanium Nitride (AlTiN) coated endmills using Cathodic arc deposition technique

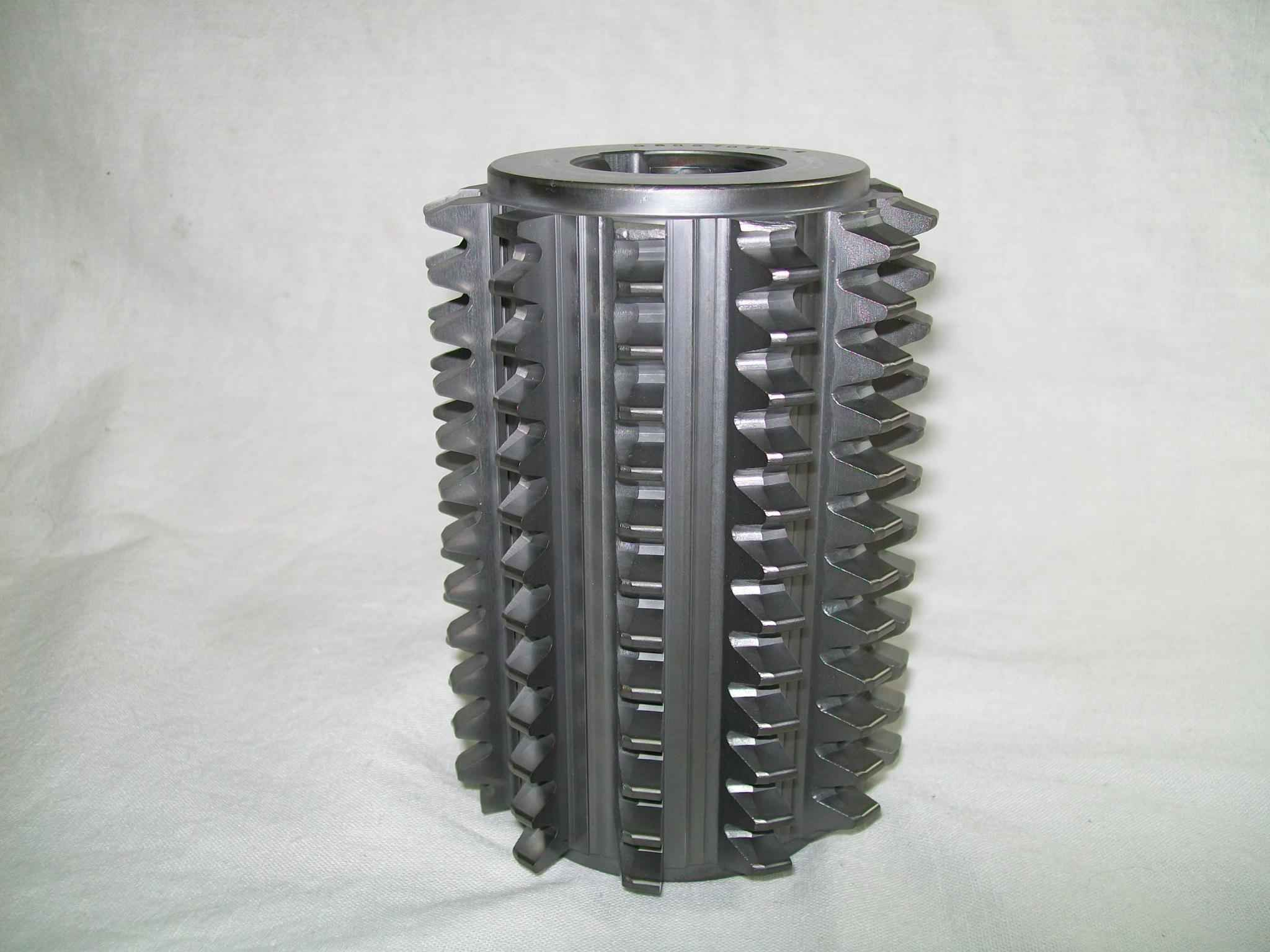
Aluminium Chromium Titanium Nitride (AlCrTiN) coated Hob using Cathodic arc deposition technique

Cathodic arc deposition is actively used to synthesize extremely hard films to protect the surface of cutting tools and extend their life significantly. A wide variety of thin hard-film, Superhard coatings and nanocomposite coatings can be synthesized by this technology including TiN, TiAlN, CrN, ZrN, AlCrTiN and TiAlSiN.

This is also used quite extensively particularly for carbon ion deposition to create diamond-like carbon films. Because the ions are blasted from the surface ballistically, it is common for not only single atoms, but larger clusters of atoms to be ejected. Thus, this kind of system requires a filter to remove atom clusters from the beam before deposition. The DLC film from a filtered-arc contains an extremely high percentage of sp^{3} diamond which is known as tetrahedral amorphous carbon, or ta-C.

Filtered Cathodic arc can be used as metal ion/plasma source for Ion implantation and Plasma Immersion Ion Implantation and Deposition (PIII&D).

== See also ==
- Ion beam deposition
- Physical vapor deposition
