= List of metalworking occupations =

Metalworking occupations include:

== The oldest of the metalworking occupations ==
- Smith (a.k.a. metalsmith), such as blacksmith or silversmith
- Jeweler
- Founder

== The machining trades ==
- Production machinist, which may involve various related machining occupations that often overlap:
  - Manual machine tool operator
  - CNC programmer is the person who takes the drawings made by engineers and draftsperson and creates a CNC program to cut the part
  - CNC setup hand, the person who sets up the machine and its tooling before the operator takes over
  - CNC operator: the person who feeds stock to the machine, changes cutting inserts, checks quality, cleans and lubricates the machine, etc.
- Tool and die maker and related machining occupations:
  - Moldmaker
  - Patternmaker
  - Modelmaker

== The fabricating and erecting trades ==
- Steel erector, also known as an ironworker
- Welder
- Boilermaker
- Pipefitter
- Millwright
- Blacksmith
- Gunsmith
- Marquetarian (though often dealing exclusively with wood, ivory or other non-metallic materials)
- Farrier
- Furniture maker
- Pewterer
- Damascener

== Other occupations within a metalworking plant ==
- Laborer, unskilled and semiskilled workers who support metalworking operations and who often develop their skills to move into the other occupations listed here. Sometimes laborers' positions may be called by more specific names, such as oiler. Technology in general, and automation in particular, tends to exert pressure against laborer-type job creation, with the lowest-skilled positions being most at risk. For example, so-called labor gangs, groups of men assigned to shoveling or other manual tasks, are not employed nearly as much as they used to be, especially in developed economies. Some jobs, despite being classifiable as semiskilled work, actually require quite a bit of talent and experience to be done well, for example, band saw operators or buffing and polishing workers.
- Rigger, a person specializing in the skills needed to move large, heavy objects
- Heavy equipment operator, a person who operates engineering vehicles (also known as heavy equipment)
- Shipping-and-receiving workers, such as forklift drivers and packagers
- Manager, a businessperson who manages the work of others
- Quality assurance (QA) staff, who are usually inspectors with additional training in quality management systems, focus not only on finding defects that have occurred (inspection) but also on preventing defects from happening in the first place by engineering processes that lower the probability of their occurrence. The latter causes QA to overlap with statistics and industrial engineering.
  - Weld quality assurance staff, ensuring the quality of weldments.
    - Weld inspectors require training in metallurgy that ranges anywhere from an undergraduate familiarity all the way up to, in some cases, that of a university materials science academic. This is in addition to learning about the many types of welding equipment and techniques that exist today. A spectrum of capabilities exists between welders and weld inspectors. Practicing welders may have more experience with the technique (holding the wire and torches just right to make an excellent weld rather than a poor one, analogously to how a musician must play a musical instrument just right, with highly practiced deftness of fine motor control, in order to produce an excellent sound rather than a poor one), but inspectors may have greater training in the metallurgy involved and greater overview knowledge of a wider range of types of welding. Many weld inspectors have been, or could quickly become, practicing welders, and vice versa, while others in each role may lack the experience or training to easily switch to the other.
  - Machining quality assurance staff use equipment such as CMMs, surface plates, height gauges, and micrometers to check conformance with the GD&T-defined geometry and dimensions defined by the engineering drawing or 3D model. The skills of these staff members and of the machinists themselves overlap; some inspectors have been, or could quickly become, practicing machinists, and vice versa, while others in each role may lack the experience or training to easily switch to the other.
  - Metallurgist, a person who assures the chemical and physical traits of the metal, whether raw mill products or semifinished or finished parts and weldments.

== Occupations closely related to metalworking ==
- Miner of ore or minerals
- Scrap processor
- Union representative, sometimes a practicing tradesperson doing the job part-time, other times someone doing the job full-time
- Truck driver, a person who drives trucks (also known as lorries)
- The various engineering disciplines, especially:
  - Mechanical engineer
  - Chemical engineer
  - Industrial engineer
  - Materials engineer
  - Civil engineer
