= Scriber =

Hand tool for making marks on workpieces

Scribers
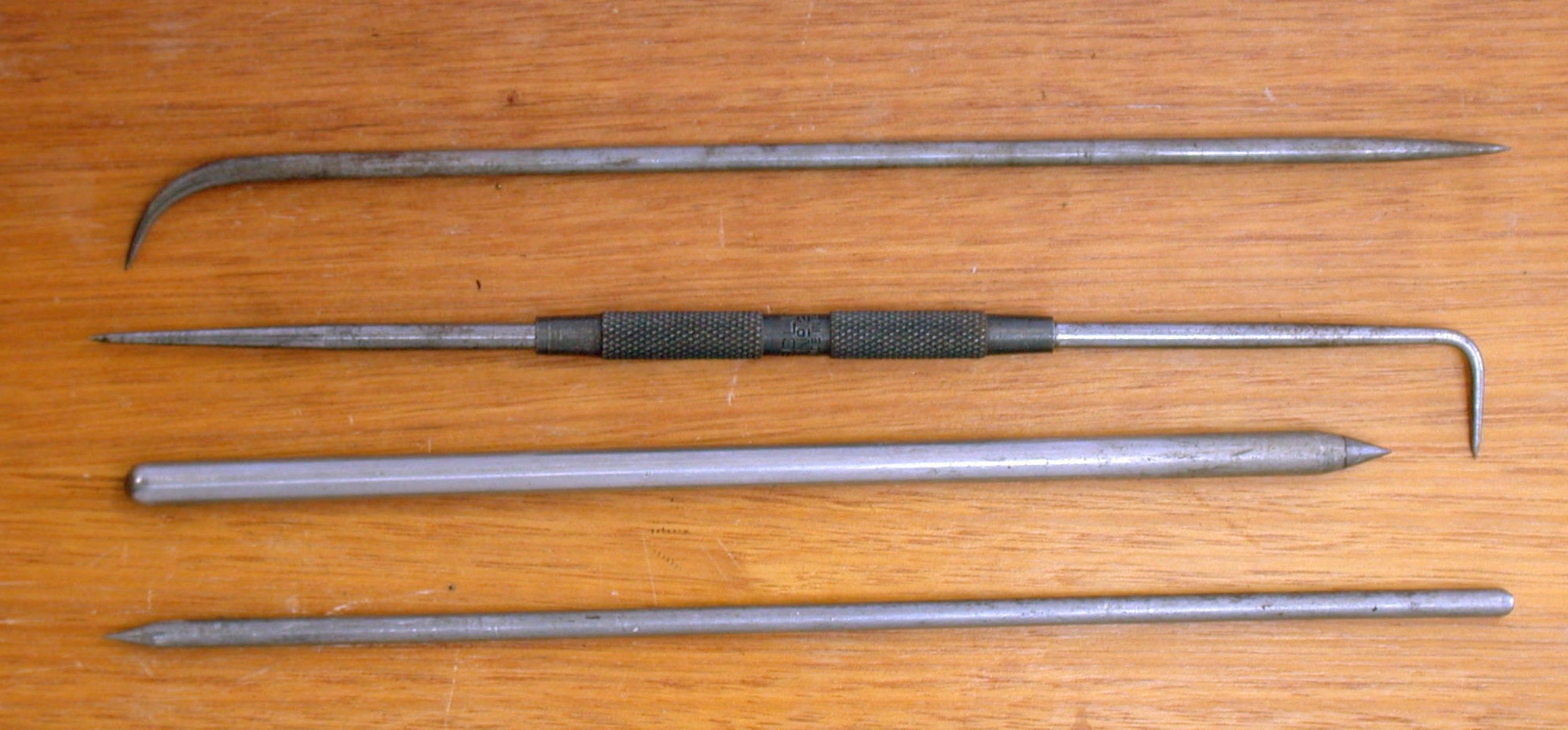
- An assortment of metal working scribers
- Classification: Hand tool
- Used with: Scriber block

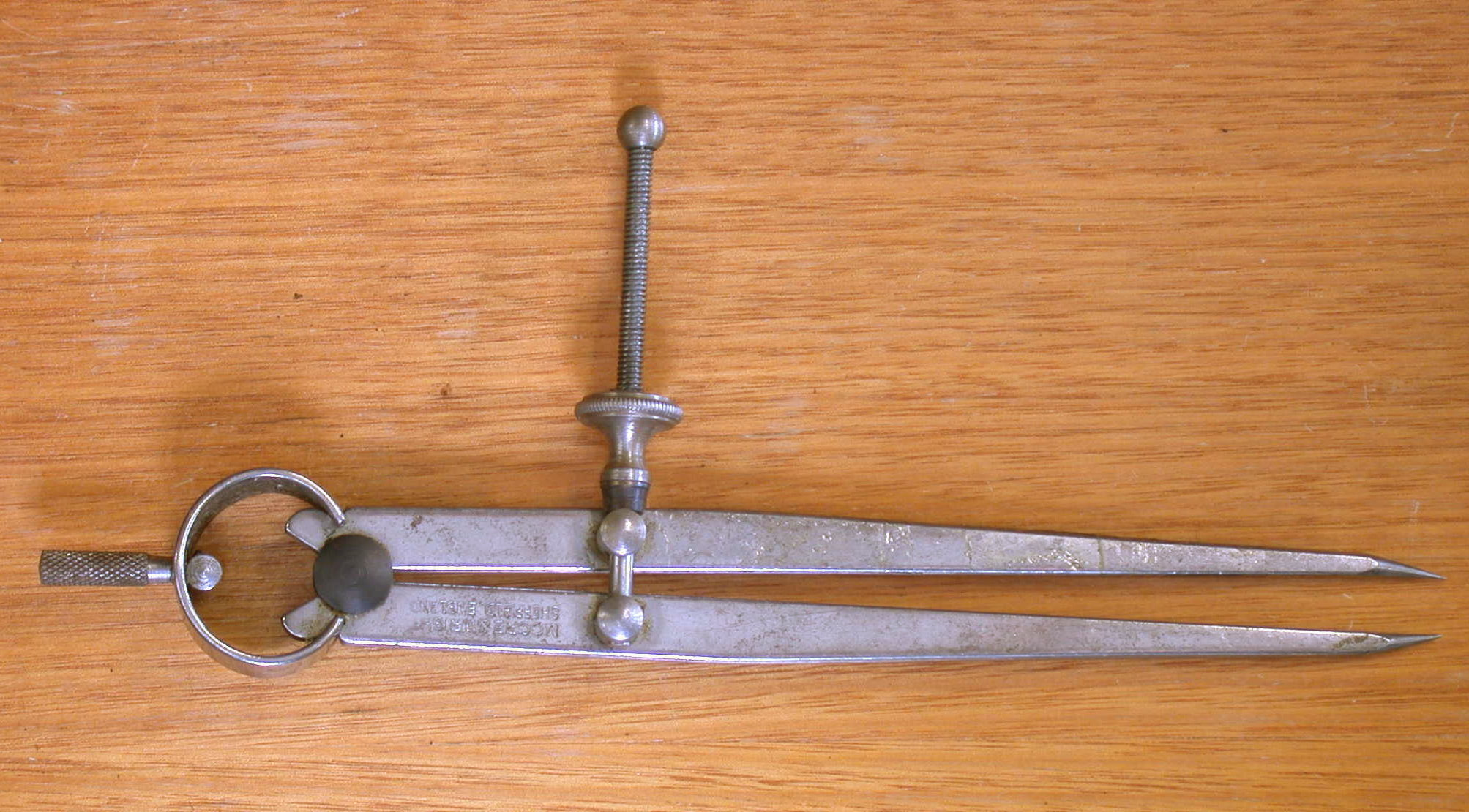
- A scribing compass
- Classification: Hand tool

A scriber is a hand tool used in metal work to mark lines on workpieces, prior to machining. The process of using a scriber is called scribing and is just part of the process of marking out. It is used instead of pencils or ink lines, because the latter are hard to see, easily erased, and imprecise due to their wide mark; scribe lines are thin and semi-permanent. On non-coated workpieces marking blue is commonly used to increase the contrast of the mark lines.

They are a rod with a tip made of cast steel that has been hardened and tempered. The point is sharpened to an angle of 30 or 40 degrees. Some scribers have a point at both ends. It is used by dragging the point over the surface of the workpiece to leave a shallow scratch on its surface.

== Scriber block ==
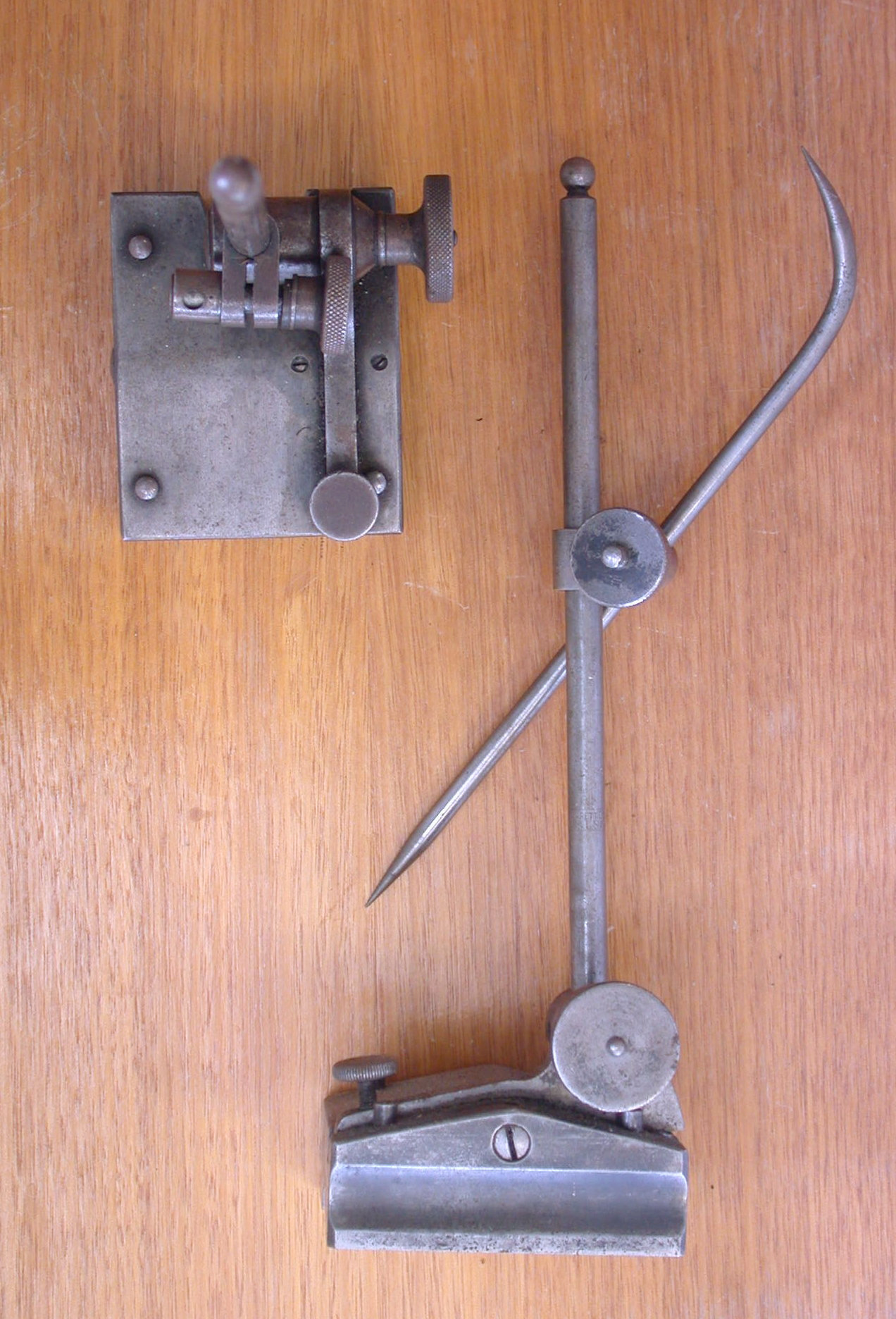
A scriber block or surface height gauge

A scriber block is used to lay out lines at a set height from the base, thus its second name surface height gauge or just surface gauge.

The workpiece is held against an angle plate so that it is perpendicular to the surface plate; the scriber block is then adjusted to the required height and used to scribe a line parallel with the table, by sliding the block along the table's surface.

The scriber block has pins that can be pushed to protrude through the base; these can then be used as limit pins to allow the block to press against the edge of the table, controlling its movement in that plane. The upright post can be adjusted to tilt back or forward, effectively moving the scriber point up or down in a controlled fashion; coarse adjustments are made by sliding the scriber along its clamping block.

The scriber block may also be used in place of a dial indicator to detect run out (a variation in concentricity) of a workpiece mounted in a four-jaw chuck. The scriber point acts as a visual reference against which any variation in the workpiece can be judged. It is also used to check the trueness of the flat surface.
