= Rod drawing =

Rod drawing may refer to:

- Bar drawing, the drawing of solid stock through a die to decrease its cross-section
- A specific type of tube drawing that uses a rod as a mandrel
