= Marking out =

Transferring dimensions from a plan to a workpiece

Marking out or layout means the process of transferring a design or pattern to a workpiece, as the first step in the manufacturing process. It is performed in many industries or hobbies although in the repetition industries the machine's initial setup is designed to remove the need to mark out every individual piece.

== Manufacturing ==
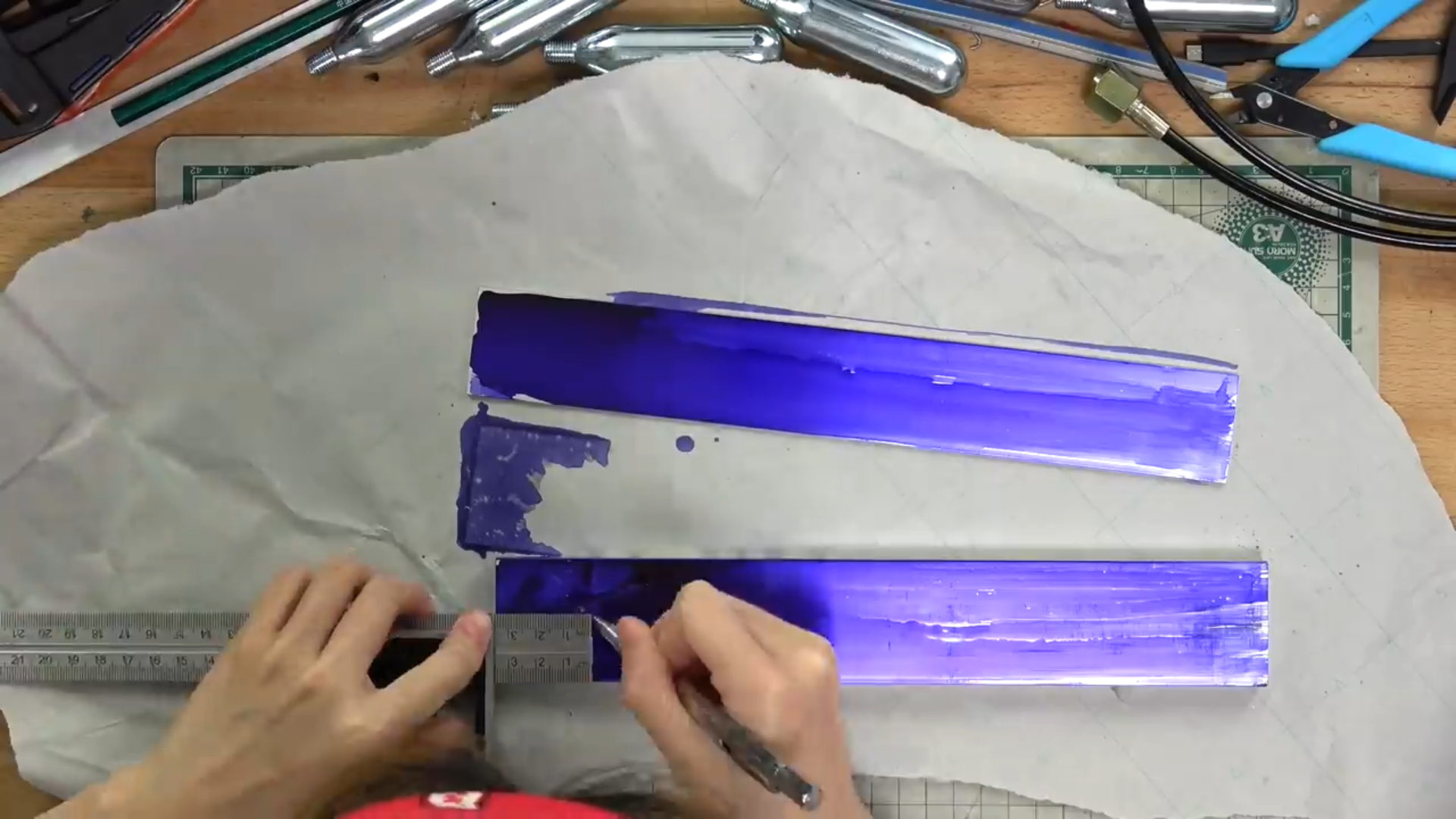
Metal covered in marking blue, ready for marking

Marking out consists of transferring the dimensions from the plan to the workpiece in preparation for the next step, machining or manufacture.

Typical tools include:

- Surface plate or marking out table — provides a true surface from which to work
- Angle plates — assist in holding the workpiece perpendicular to the table
- Scriber — is the equivalent of a pen or pencil. It literally scratches the metal surface leaving behind a fine, bright line
- Height gauge or scribing block — allows lines to be scribed at a preset distance, from the tables surface
- Surface gauge — an ungraduated comparison measuring tool that performs much the same function as the vernier height gauge. It is often used in conjunction with a dial indicator and a precision height gauge.
- Marking blue — to provide a usable writing surface by covering any existing scratches and providing a contrasting background
- Profile gauge
- Protractor — to assist in the transfer of angular measurements
- Combination square — an alternative tool for transferring angular measurements
- Square — to transfer 90° angles to the workpiece
- Punches — either prick or center punch to create permanent marks or dimples for drill bits to start in
  - Automatic center punch — a spring-loaded punch that creates prick punch marks without the need for a ball peen hammer
- Ball peen hammer — used in conjunction with the punches to provide the striking blow needed
- Dividers or measuring compass — used for marking out circles of any desired radius,
- Parallels to aid in holding workpieces in specific positions and comparing measurements.

== Welding ==
As welding does not always require the use of fine tolerances, marking out is usually performed by using centre punches, hammers, tape measures and chalk.

The "chalk" is actually a small pre-cut block of talc (soapstone). These talc blocks can be sharpened to a stronger point than the softer blackboard chalk. The color of the chalk provides good contrast against the dark color of the hot rolled steel that is generally used.

== Woodworking ==
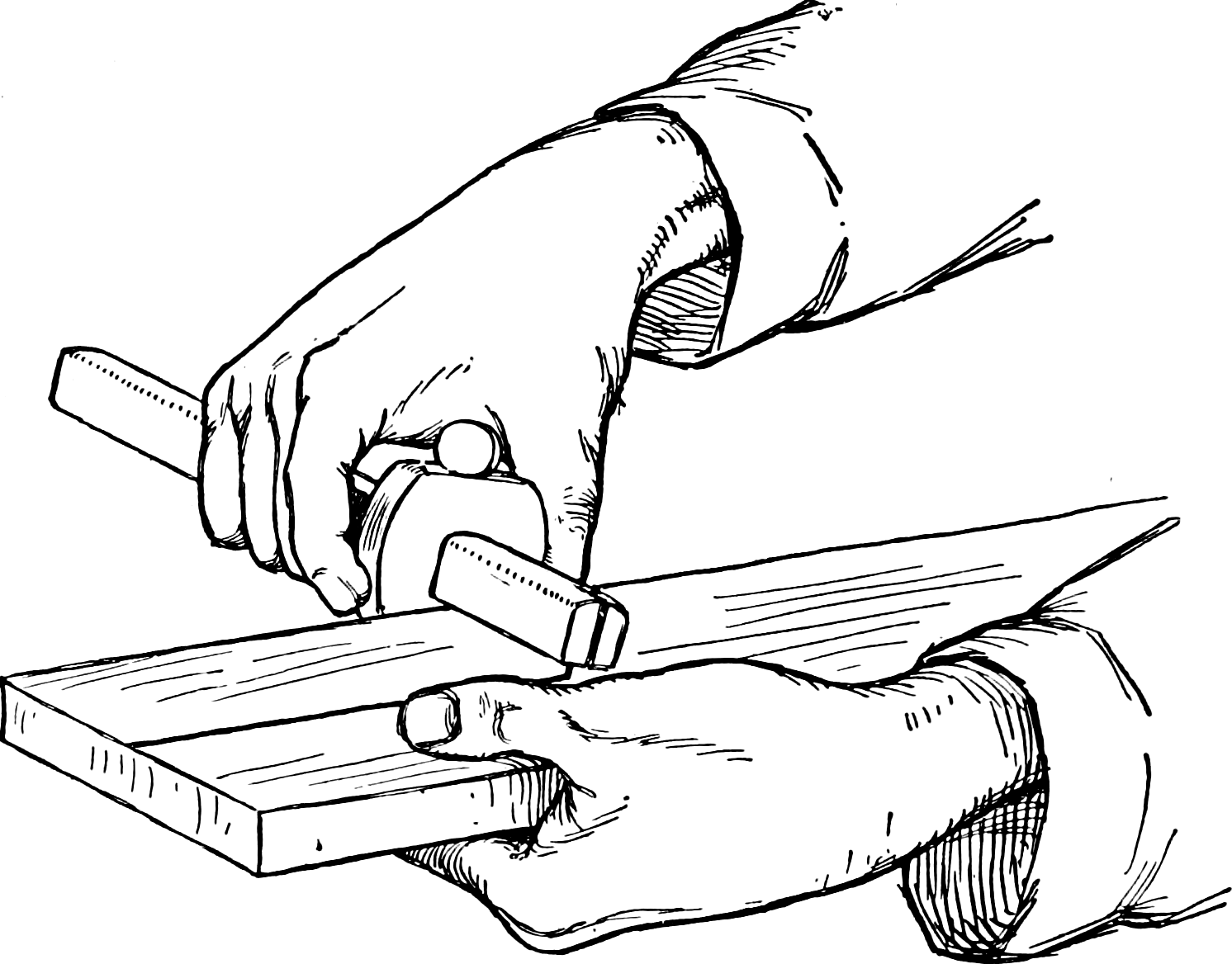
Marking out wood with a marking gauge

In carpentry and joinery practice a pencil is used for marking while in cabinetmaking a marking knife provides for greater accuracy. A storey pole is used to lay out repeated measurements such as the location of joints in timber framing, courses of siding such as wood shingles and clapboards, the heights of doorjambs and the courses of bricks in masonry. Carpenters typically mark out framing members on-center, the measurements are to the centers of each member.
