= Brett Kavanaugh assassination plot =

2022 plot to assassinate U.S. Supreme Court justice

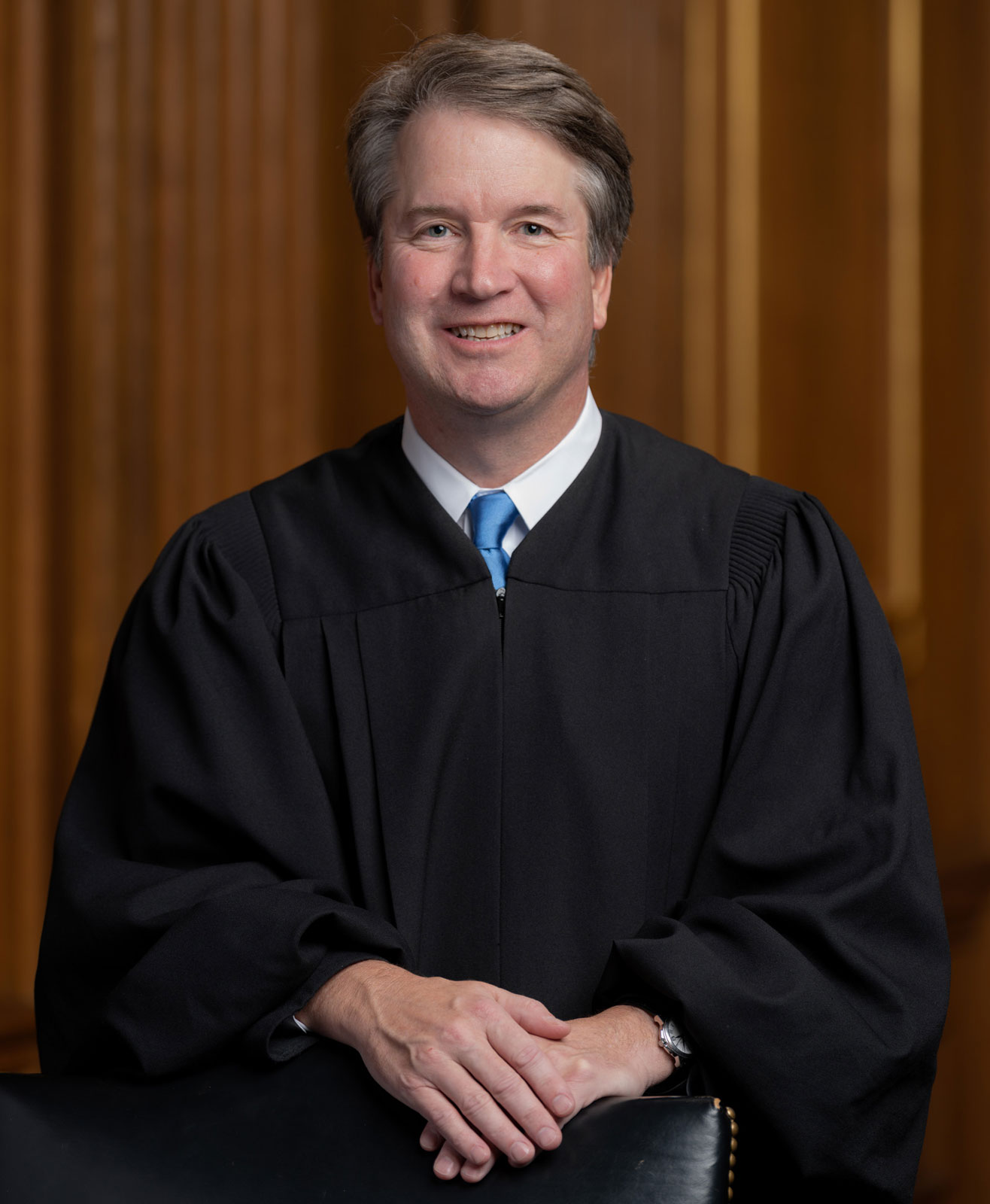
- Kavanaugh's Supreme Court portrait
- Location: Chevy Chase, Maryland, U.S.
- Date: June 8, 2022; 4 years ago 1:05 a.m. (EST)
- Target: Brett Kavanaugh
- Attack type: Attempted assassination, attempted murder-suicide
- Deaths: 0
- Injuries: 0
- Perpetrator: Sophie Roske (Note: Charged under Roske's legal name, Nicholas John Roske)
- Charges: Attempted murder of a Justice of the United States

On June 8, 2022, Sophie Roske (then known as Nicholas John Roske) traveled to the home of Brett Kavanaugh, an associate justice of the United States Supreme Court, with plans to break into Kavanaugh's home, kill him, and then kill herself. After arriving at Kavanaugh's residence and alerting on-site U.S. Marshals, Roske called the police on herself and was arrested.

Roske told police she was frustrated with the leaked Supreme Court decision that was poised to overrule Roe v. Wade, the 1973 decision that guaranteed abortion as a right, as well as a recent school shooting in Uvalde, Texas, and the possibility of the Court loosening gun restrictions under the Second Amendment.

On October 3, 2025, Roske was sentenced to over eight years in prison, as well as a lifetime of supervised release.

== Assassination plot ==
Roske traveled by plane from her residence in Simi Valley, California, to the Washington, D.C., area. She then took a taxi cab to Kavanaugh's home in Chevy Chase, Maryland, arriving at 1:05 a.m. on June 8, 2022. She was wearing black clothing and was carrying a suitcase, a backpack, and several items and weapons: a Glock-17 pistol with ammunition, zip ties, a tactical knife, pepper spray, a hammer, a screwdriver, a nail punch, a crowbar, duct tape, a pistol light, and boots padded to be stealthy. Upon Roske's arrival, two deputy U.S. Marshals stationed outside Kavanaugh's home saw her step out of the cab.

After arriving and seeing the deputy U.S. Marshals, Roske started walking down the street. She then texted her sister and explained her intentions; Roske's sister convinced her to call 9-1-1. At 1:38 a.m., Roske called 9-1-1 and was connected with Montgomery County's emergency communications center. Roske told the operator that she was having suicidal thoughts, that she was armed, and that she had traveled from California to Maryland "to kill a specific United States Supreme Court justice". She also said, "I'm standing now, but I can sit, whatever. I want to be fully compliant." When police arrived, Roske was still on the phone with the communications center, and she was arrested without incident.

== Perpetrator ==
Sophie Roske (then known as Nicholas John Roske), from Simi Valley, California, was 26 years old at the time of the assassination attempt. In September 2025, Roske came out as a trans woman.

After her arrest, Roske told police she was upset about the leaked draft of Dobbs v. Jackson Women's Health Organization, which signaled the Court was positioned to overrule Roe v. Wade, the 1973 decision that declared abortion a Constitutional right. She also cited a recent school shooting in Texas and her belief that Kavanaugh would loosen gun restrictions. On internet chats, Roske wrote, "Im [sic] gonna stop roe v wade from being overturned" and that she was going to "remove some people from the supreme court". Roske's indictment alleged that her intention was to kill three conservative Supreme Court justices so that three liberal Supreme Court justices could be appointed and change the dynamics of the Supreme Court "for decades to come".

=== Legal proceedings ===
Roske has been held by authorities since her arrest on June 8, 2022. A federal grand jury indicted Roske of attempted murder of a justice of the U.S. Supreme Court. On March 18, 2023, Roske's attorneys requested more time to coordinate her defense, which was granted by Judge Peter Messitte. On July 22, 2023, Roske pleaded not guilty to the charges, and a trial date was set for June 9, 2025. However, on April 8, 2025, Roske changed her plea to guilty. Roske came out as a trans woman in September 2025, choosing the name Sophie for court communication purposes, though her legal name remains unchanged. On October 3, 2025, Judge Deborah Boardman sentenced Roske to 97 months in prison and a lifetime of supervised release. U.S. Attorney General Pam Bondi said the Justice Department would be appealing Roske's prison sentence, which she called "woefully insufficient".
