= Height gauge =

Measuring device

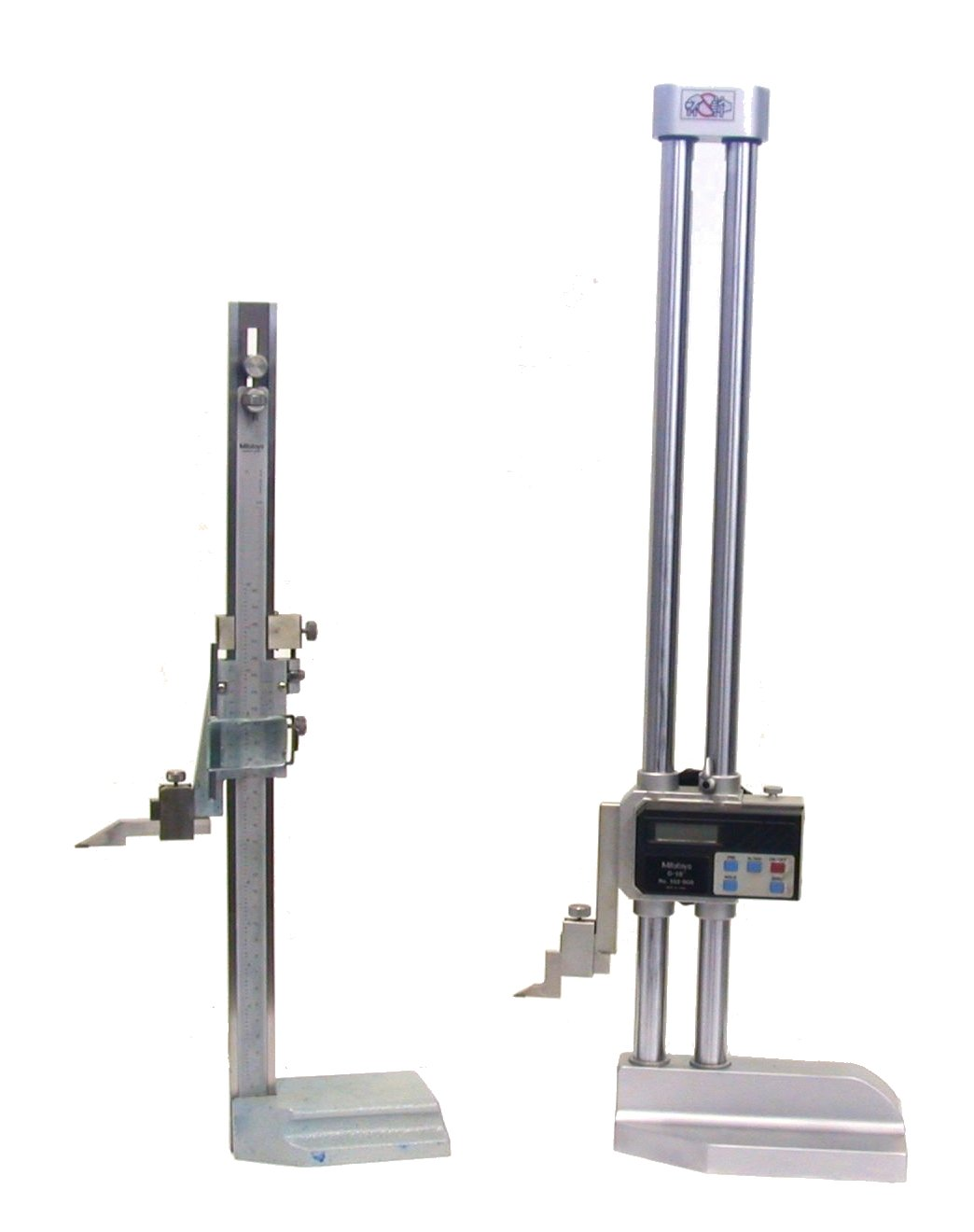
The left height gauge has the vernier scale, while the right one is an electronic height gauge with a digital readout.

A height gauge is a measuring device used for determining the height of objects, and for marking of items to be worked on.

These measuring tools are used in metalworking or metrology to either set or measure vertical distances; the pointer is sharpened to allow it to act as a scriber and assist in marking out work pieces.

Devices similar in concept, with lower resolutions, are used in health care settings (health clinics, surgeries) to find the height of people, in which context they are called stadiometers.

Height gauges may also be used to measure the height of an object by using the underside of the scriber as the datum. The datum may be permanently fixed or the height gauge may have provision to adjust the scale, this is done by sliding the scale vertically along the body of the height gauge by turning a fine feed screw at the top of the gauge; then with the scriber set to the same level as the base, the scale can be matched to it. This adjustment allows different scribers or probes to be used, as well as adjusting for any errors in a damaged or resharpened probe.

In the toolroom, the distinction between a height gauge and a surface gauge is that a height gauge has a measuring head (whether vernier, fine rack and pinion with dial, or linear encoder with digital display), whereas a surface gauge has only a scriber point. Both are typically used on a surface plate and have a heavy base with an accurately flat, smooth underside.
