= Punch (tool) =

Tool used to indent or create a hole through a hard surface

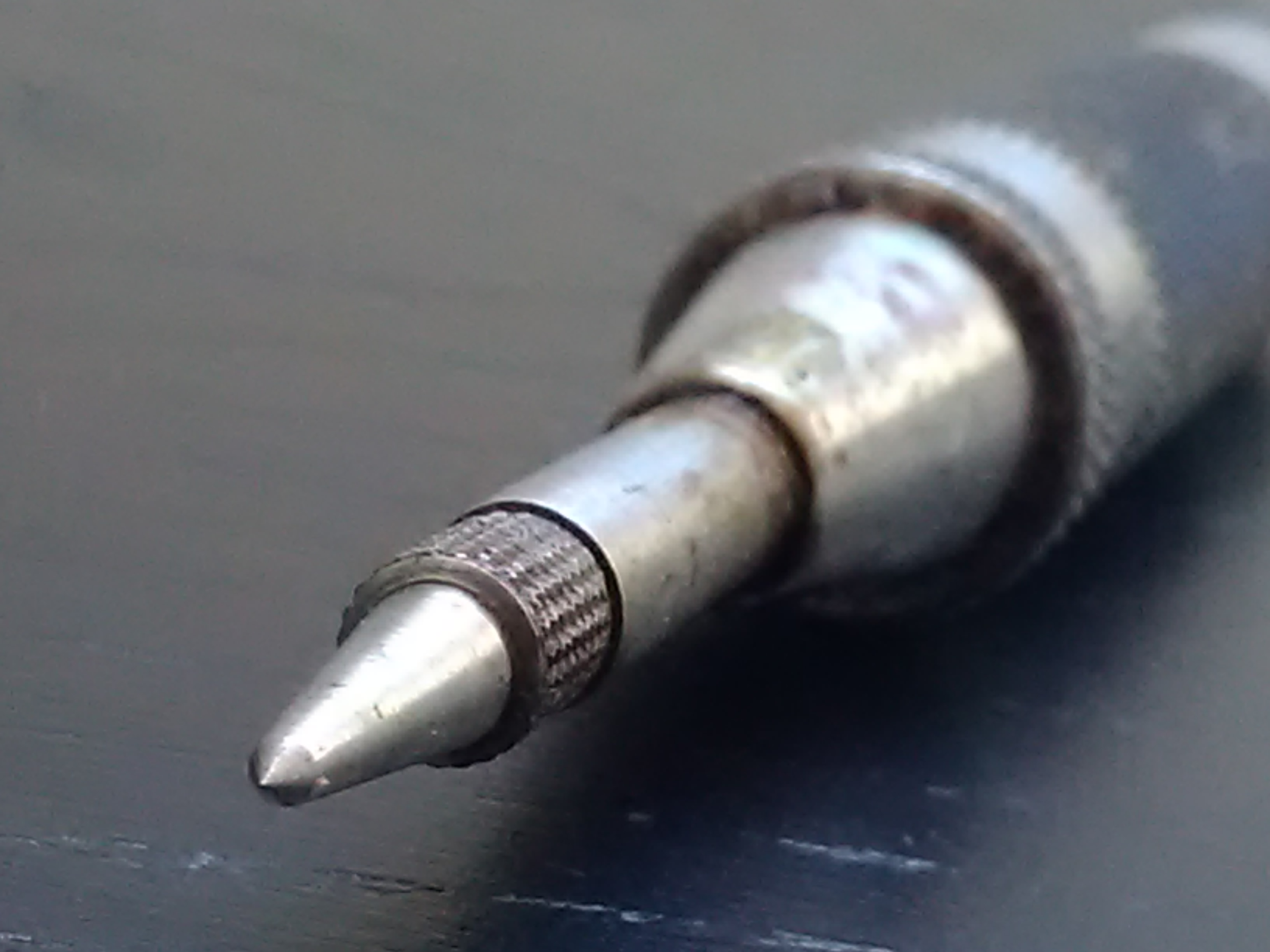
Engraving punch

A punch is a tool used to indent or create a hole through a hard surface. They usually consist of a hard metal rod with a narrow tip at one end and a broad flat "butt" at the other. When used, the narrower end is pointed against a target surface and the broad end is struck with a hammer or mallet, causing the blunt force of the blow to be transmitted through the rod body and focused more sharply onto a small area. Typically, woodworkers use a ball-peen hammer to strike a punch.

== Use ==
Punches are used to drive fasteners such as nails and dowels, making a hole, or forming an indentation or impression of the tip on a work piece. Decorative punches may also be used to create a pattern or even form an image.

== Pin ==
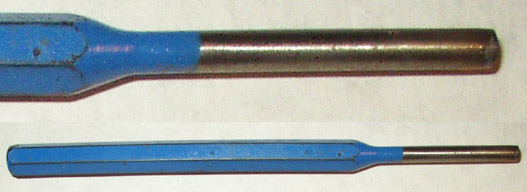
Pin punch

Metal pins and similar connectors are driven in or out of holes using a pin punch.

For removal, first use a starter punch to loosen the pin, then use a pin punch to finish.

== Center ==
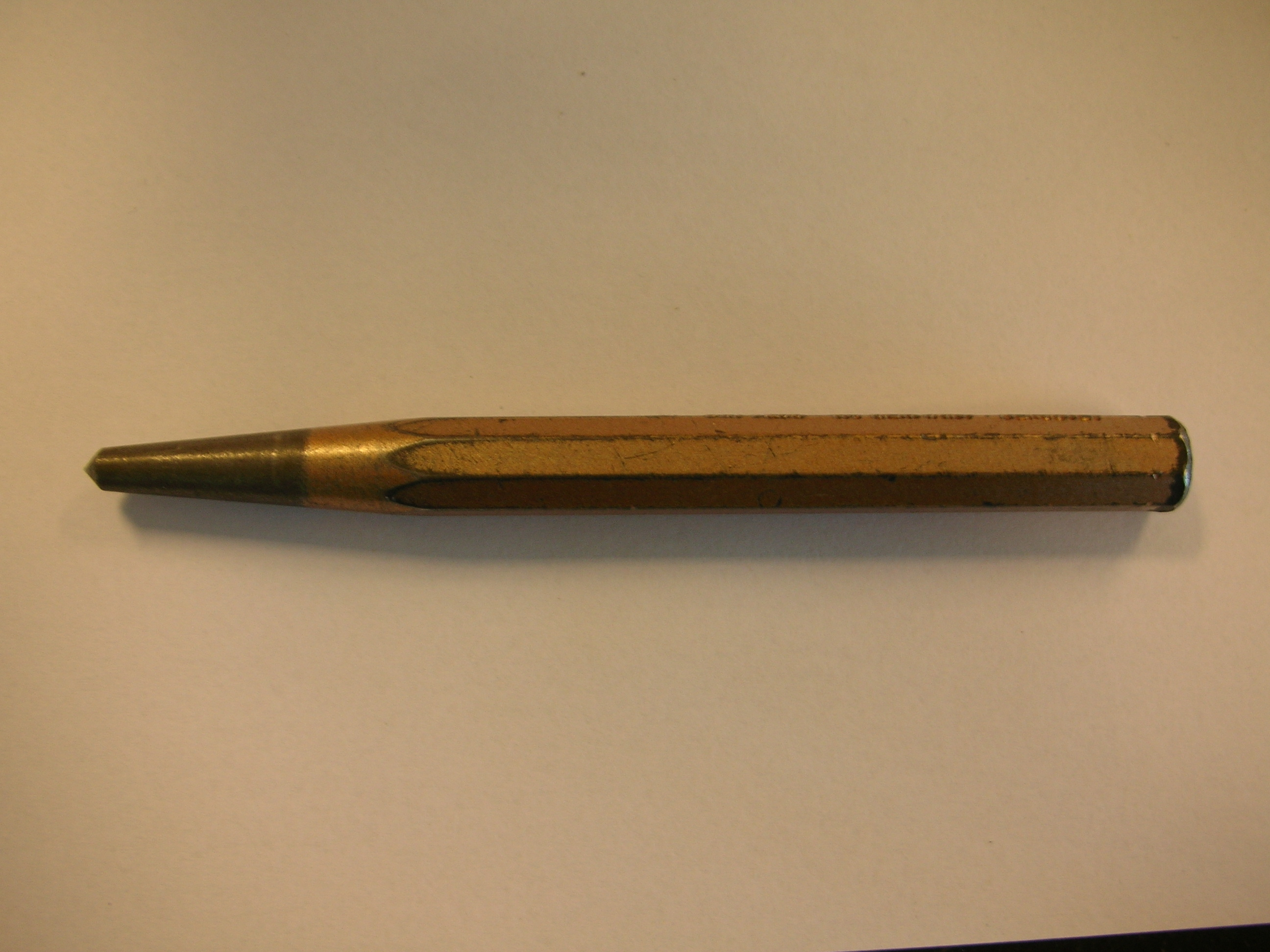
Center punch

A center punch is used to mark the center of a point. It is usually used to mark the center of a hole when drilling holes. A drill has the tendency to "wander" if it does not start in a recess. A center punch forms a large enough dimple to "guide" the tip of the drill. The tip of a center punch has an angle between 60 and 90 degrees. When drilling larger holes, where the drill bit is wider than the indentation produced by a center punch, the drilling of a pilot hole is usually needed.

An automatic center punch operates without the need for a hammer.

== Prick punch ==
Prick punch

A prick punch is similar to a center punch but used for marking out. It has a sharper angled tip to produce a narrower and deeper indentation. The indentation can then be enlarged with a center punch for drilling. The tip of a prick punch is 60 degrees (the angle depends on what type of prick punch one is using). It is also known as a dot punch.

== Transfer ==
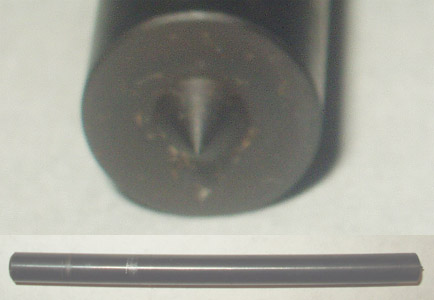
Transfer punch

A transfer punch is a punch (usually in an index set) of a specific outer diameter that is non-tapered and extends the entire length of the punch (except for the tip). It is used to tightly fit the tolerances of an existing hole and, when struck, precisely transfer the center of that hole to another surface. It can be used, for example, to duplicate the hole patterns in a part, or precisely set locations for threaded holes (created by drilling and tapping) to bolt an object to a surface.

== Drift ==
Drift punch

A drift "punch" is misleadingly named; it is not used as a punch in the traditional sense of the term. A drift punch, or drift pin, or lineup punch, is used as an aid in aligning bolt or rivet holes prior to inserting a fastener. A drift punch is constructed as a tapered rod, with the hammer acting on the large end of the taper. The long end of a drift punch is placed into the semi-aligned bolt holes of two separate components, and then driven into the hole. As it is driven in, the taper forces the two components into alignment, allowing for easy insertion of the fastener. Unlike most punches, force is never (and should never be) applied to the tip, or end of a drift pin.

== Roll pins ==
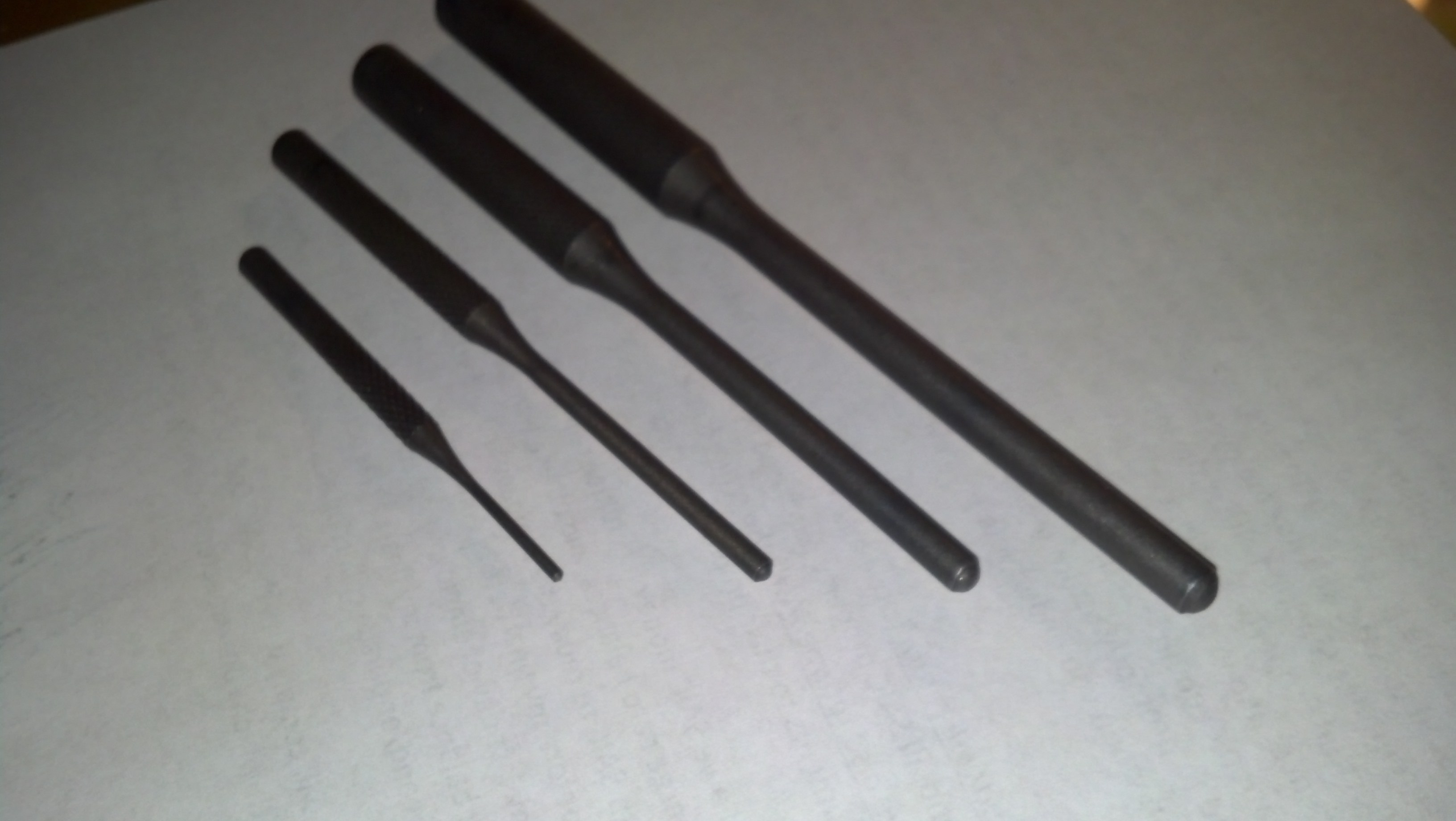
Roll pin punches

Roll pin punches are used to drive roll pins. Standard pin punches should never be used on a roll pin. Because of the hollow, thin wall construction of a roll pin, a standard pin punch will often collapse, mar or distort the end of the pin or be driven into, and jammed inside, the hollow core of the roll pin. When choosing a roll pin punch, select one that is no larger than the compressed diameter of the pin. If a punch is used that is larger than the pin, the surrounding metal in which the pin is seated can be damaged. Also, a roll pin punch should not be used which is smaller than the compressed diameter of the pin. If this occurs, it may be possible to drive the punch through the hollow center of the roll pin.

Roll pin punches are designed with a small projection in the center of the pin tip to support the circumference of the roll pin. The tips of roll pin punches are not flat and should never be used on regular solid pins. If a roll pin punch is used on a solid pin, it will mar or mark the pin.

If the end of a roll pin punch is damaged or deformed, it should be discarded. It is virtually impossible to regrind the tip of the roll pin punch and properly shape the center projection.

When using a roll pin punch, make sure the axis of the shank of the roll pin punch is in line with the axis of the roll pin. Do not cant the roll pin punch off to one side. When you strike the roll pin punch, hit it directly on the top of its head. If you strike the head of the roll pin punch at an angle you may bend the shank.

== Letter ==
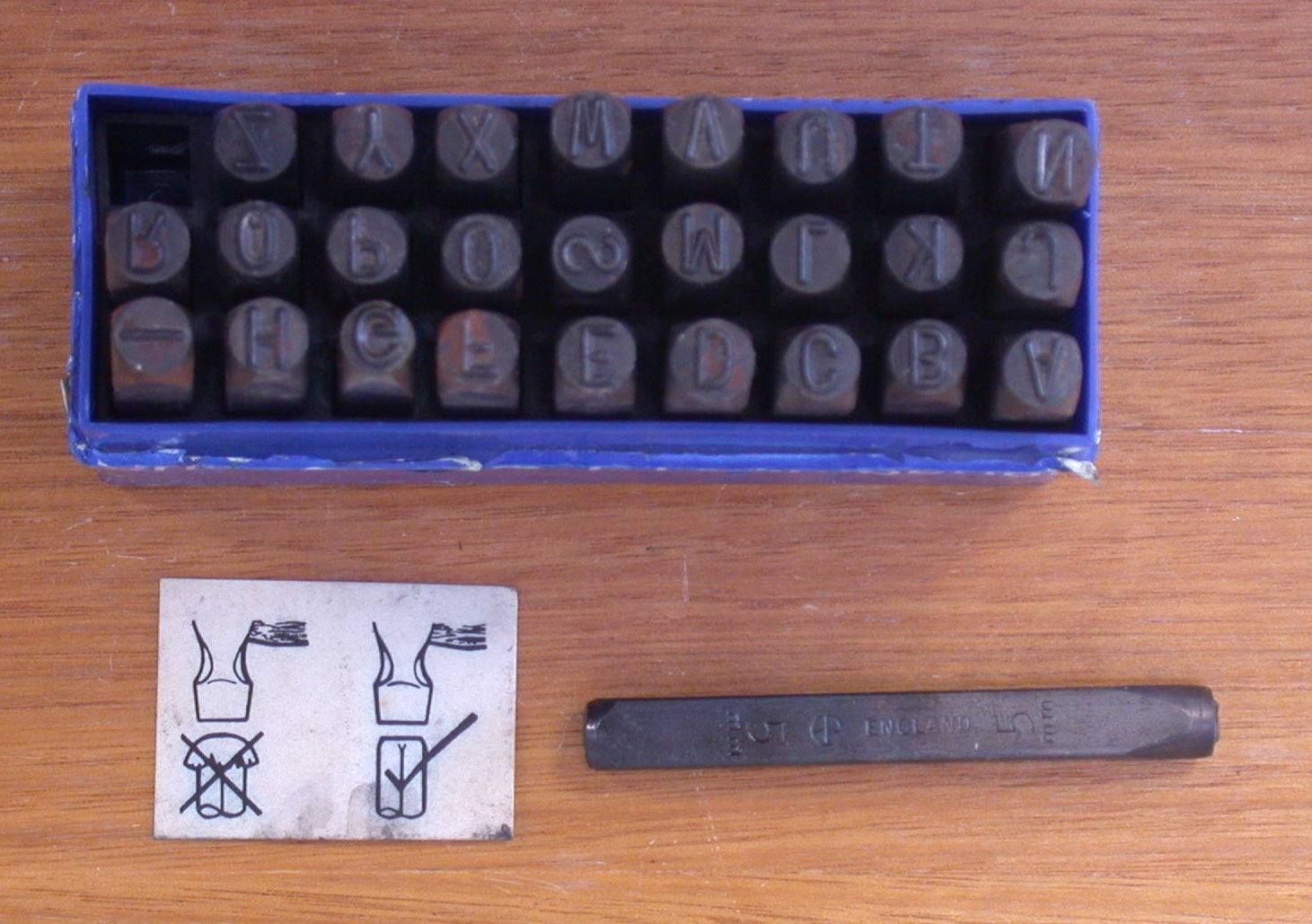
Letter stamps

Also known as letter stamps or number stamps, letter punches are used to emboss the impression of a letter or number into a workpiece. They are most common in the reverse image, this allows the result to be immediately readable, regardless if they may be made as a positive image. This is essential in the case of die or mold making and ensures that the finished product will be readable, as a die is a negative image.

== Hallmark ==
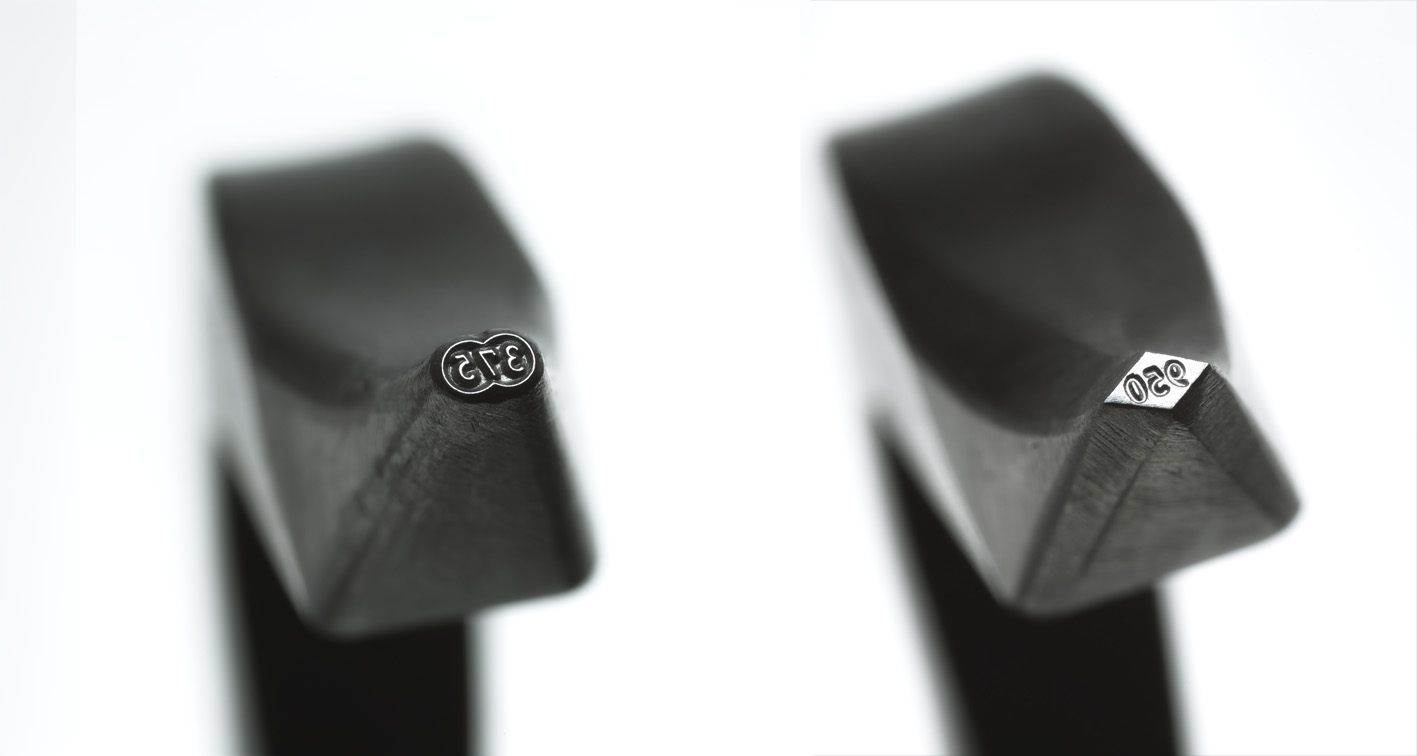
Australian karat stamps for gold (375) and platinum (950).

Specially-made stamps used to strike hallmarks for metal, maker, manufacturing date (also known as date letter), city (or county), fineness, or assay office, to certify the content of noble metals—such as platinum, gold, silver.

== Tablet press ==
These punches are a part of a tablet press. Unlike most punches, tablet press punches have a concave ending in the shape of the desired tablet. There are the lower and the upper punches to compress the powder in between.

== See also ==
Golden punch in the coat of arms of Äetsä

- Cookie cutter
- Nailset
- Pointillé
- Punchcutting
- Punching
- Punching machine
