= Mandrel =

Gently tapered cylinder against which material can be forged or shaped

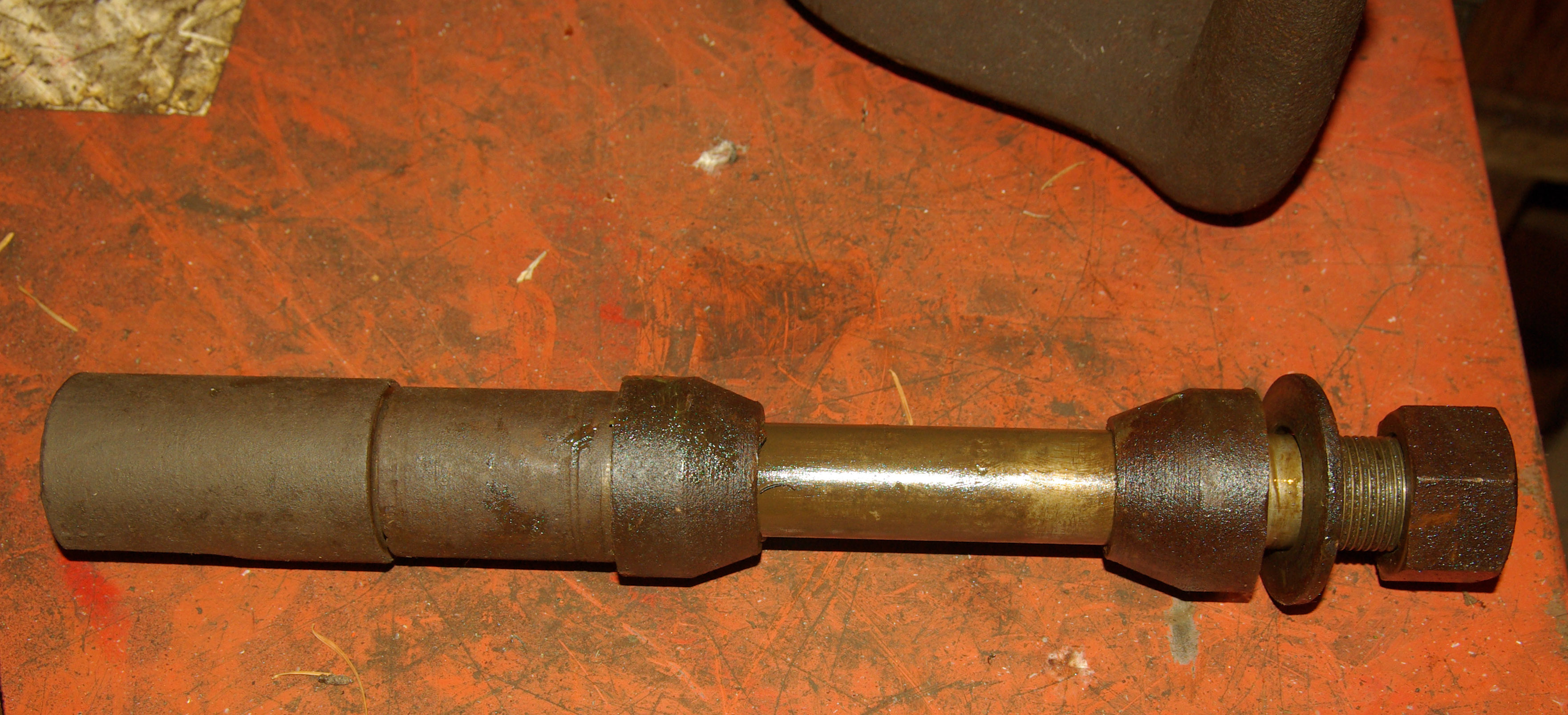
Old shop-made mandrel for turning hollow objects on an engine lathe

A mandrel, mandril or arbor is a tapered tool against which material can be forged, pressed, stretched or shaped (e.g., a ring mandrel – also called a triblet – used by jewellers to increase the diameter of a wedding ring), or a flanged or tapered or threaded bar that grips a workpiece to be machined in a lathe. A flanged mandrel is a parallel bar of a specific diameter with an integral flange towards one end, and threaded at the opposite end. Work is gripped between the flange and a nut on the thread. A tapered mandrel (often called a plain mandrel) has a taper of approximately 0.005 inches per foot and is designed to hold work by being driven into an accurate hole on the work, gripping the work by friction. A threaded mandrel may have a male or female thread, and work which has an opposing thread is screwed onto the mandrel.

On a lathe, mandrels are commonly mounted between centres and driven by a lathe dog (typically flanged or tapered mandrels), but may also be gripped in a chuck (typically threaded mandrels) where the outer face of work is to be machined. Threaded mandrels may also be mounted between centres.

In addition to lathes, mandrels, more usually referred to as "arbours", are used to hold buffing wheels, circular saws and sanding discs. Typically, such mandrels consist of a cylinder that is threaded on one end. There are many different types of mandrel for specialised applications. Examples include live chuck mandrels, live bull ring mandrels and dead bull ring mandrels.

== Variants ==
Rotary tool mandrel with an accompanying grinding wheel

=== In machining ===
An example of one type of mandrel is a shaped bar of metal inserted in, or next to, an item to be machined or bent in a certain pattern, e.g. in drawing metal tubing. Exhaust pipes for automobiles are frequently bent using a mandrel during manufacture. The mandrel allows the exhaust pipes to be bent into smooth curves without undesirable creasing, kinking or collapse. Molten glass may also be so shaped.

A chuck is used on a lathe to hold pieces of wood, metal or plastic to be machined as they are turned. In this way, rods can be threaded, furniture legs are turned to a desired shape, and irregularly-shaped objects can be given a round shape. Several types of mandrel are used with lathes. Original expanding mandrels have a slightly tapered wedge that will expand to hold the item.

A third type of mandrel is that which is used to hold circular saw blades, buffing wheels (used for polishing), and sanding discs onto drills, circular saws, and similar power tools. A mandrel of this type generally consists of a cylinder, threaded on one end, with a washer brazed onto the threaded end and an accompanying screw and second washer used to clamp the circular saw blade, sanding media or other rotary tool onto the mandrel.

While most mandrels are driven by direct connection to an electric motor or other engine, other mandrels may be driven by attachment to a bearing-supported, pulley-driven shaft.

=== In jewellery ===
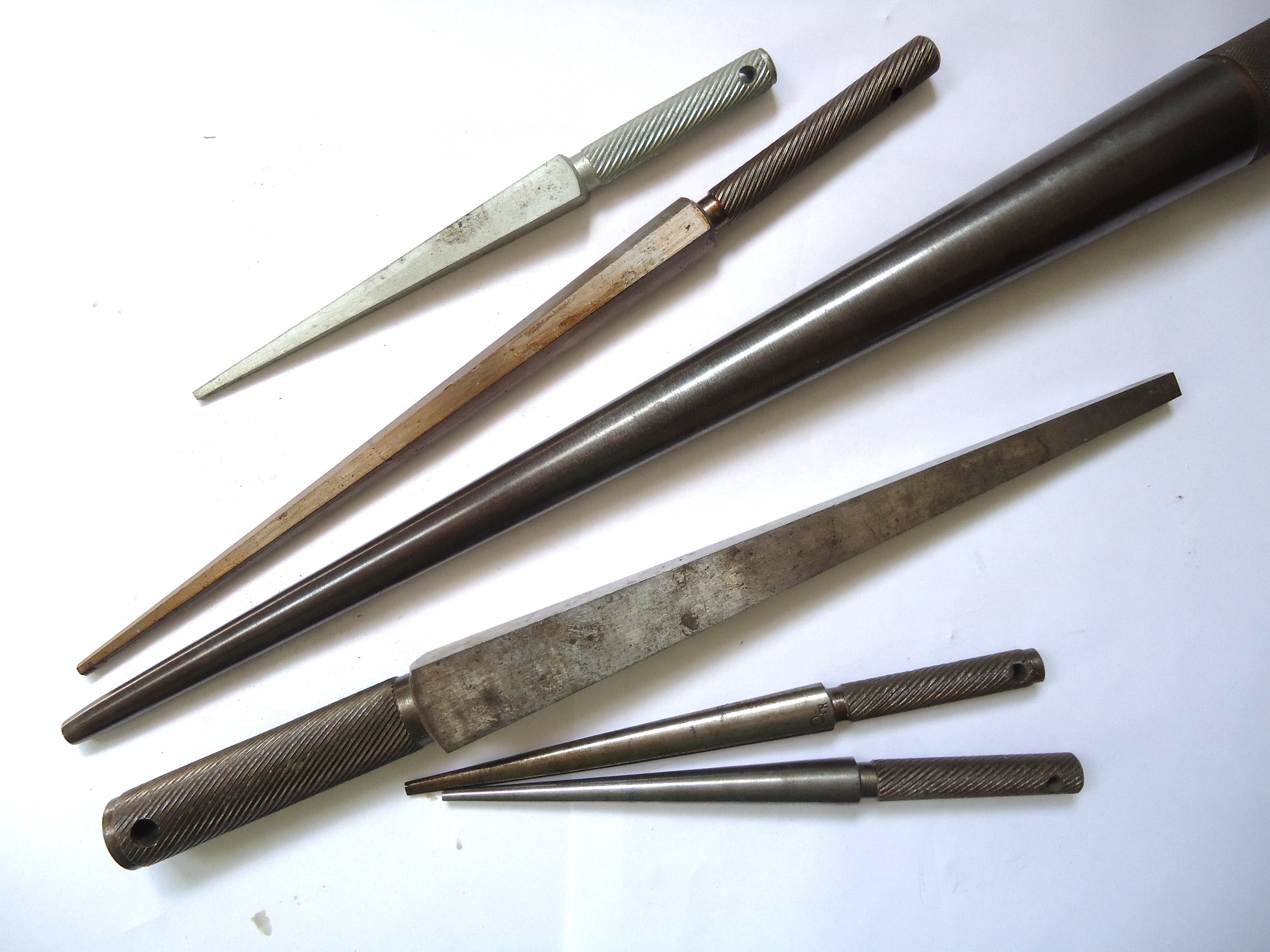
Several types of 'triblet' along with other jewellery mandrels

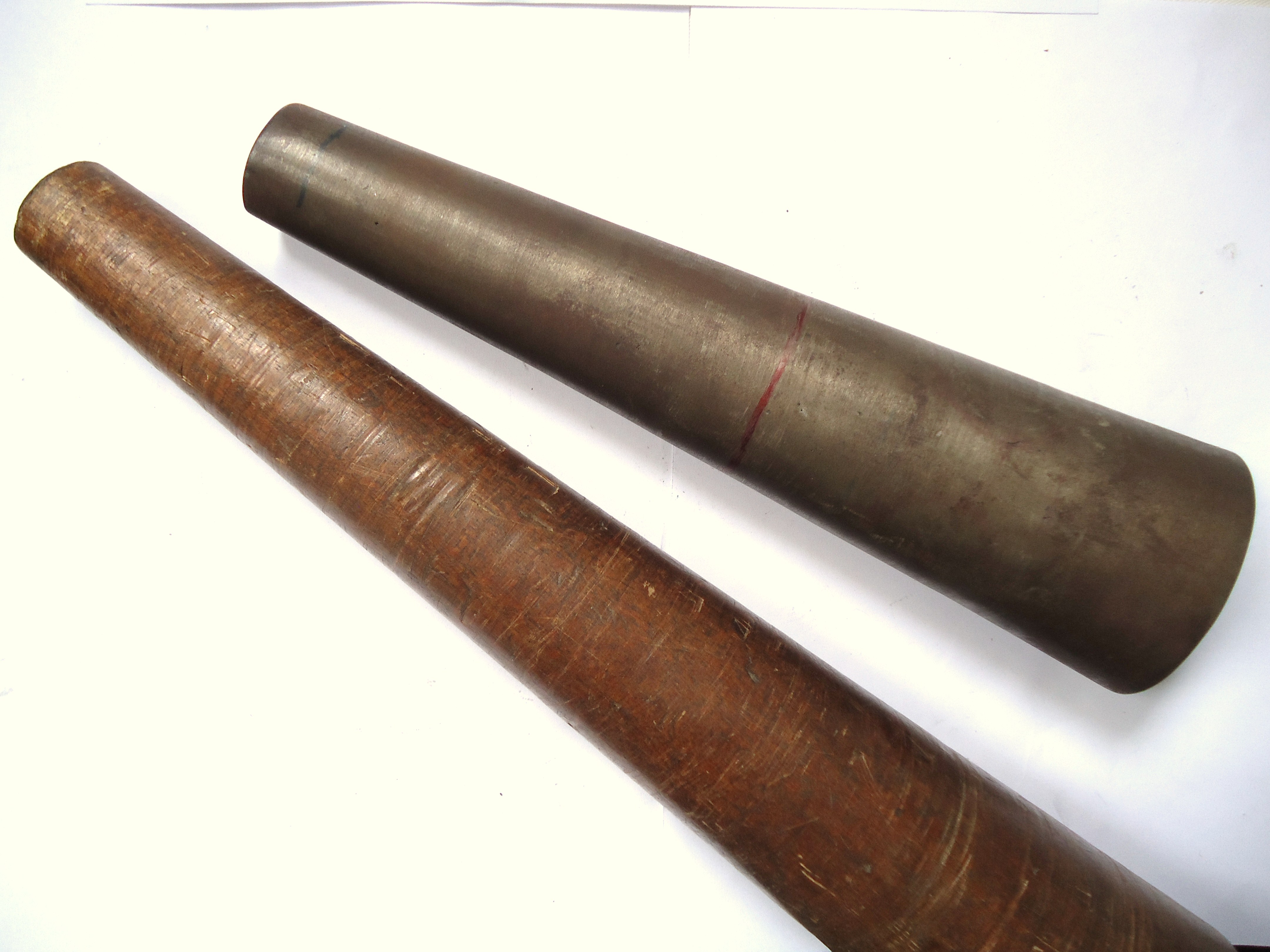
Wood and steel mandrels for shaping bracelets

A 'triblet' is a type of mandrel found in jewelry manufacturing that is not inserted into or held by a machine. Such mandrels vary in sizes and shapes, from small tapered metal rods (ring mandrels) to freestanding metal conic sections (used for making bracelets). Unlike with mechanical mandrels, the process is performed by hand. When shaping a ring or bangle with a triblet, it is typical to bend and solder the metal into a rough loop, then place it over the thinner end of the mandrel. Once done, the next step is to strike the work in a downward motion with a hammer or other tool to push it towards the wider end. This forces the metal to adopt a true ring-shape. Triblets with measurements cut into them (called 'ring size sticks') can also be used as a quick way of measuring the final size of a ring. A triblet can also be used to make a ring slightly bigger by gently tapping it in order to force it down the cone – thus stretching the metal. Triblets are also used to repair squashed or damaged rings.

=== In music ===
A type of mandrel is also used in making reeds for double reed instruments such as the bassoon or oboe.

== Uses ==
Pulley-driven mandrel used to hold lawn tractor cutting blades

Mandrels are also used in industrial composite fabrication, such as in filament winding. During the manufacturing process, resin-impregnated filaments are wound around a mandrel to create a composite material structure or part. The structure is cured, and the mandrel is removed. One problem with this type of process is difficulty in removing the mandrel from the completed work. A mandrel with a changeable shape can be more easily extracted. When heated above a certain temperature, the mandrel becomes elastic and can be manipulated into the desired shape and then cooled to become rigid again in the new shape. It can then be used in the filament winding process. Once the composite part is cured, the mandrel can be reheated until elastic and easily removed from the cured part. These types of mandrels can be used repeatedly.

A mandrel can also be made of a metal alloy that melts at low temperature. In this process, the composite is laid over the mandrel, heated to cure the material, and then the mandrel is removed by increasing the temperature to melt the mandrel, allowing it to drain.

In the production of steel core used for flexible drives, the center wire upon which the subsequent layers are wound is referred to as a mandrel. This "center wire" may itself be composed of either a single wire or layers, depending on the sizing of the finished product.

A hole saw usually attaches to a mandrel, the latter being basically a drill bit with threads to secure the saw.

== History ==
Mandrels are not recent inventions. Metal machining utilising the spinning process has been recorded as far back as ancient Egyptian times. In metal spinning, a wood or metal spinning mandrel is used, the form of which corresponds with the internal contour of the part to be produced. This method securely clamps the raw material and allows for accurate machining into the desired final form. Since the material is clamped internally, there is no interference to the operator from the lathe/mandrel assembly during production.

The traversing mandrel was introduced around 1700, and instantiated the design of a lathe mandrel able to slide axially in its bearings under the control of the operator, so that components having short lengths of thread could be produced, such as screws. The traversing mandrel was primarily employed by watchmakers and ornamental turners during this era. Eventually the device was superseded by a mandrel-driven device called a leadscrew, which uses a train of gears that can be altered as required for the turning application.
