= Lathe faceplate =

Workholding accessory

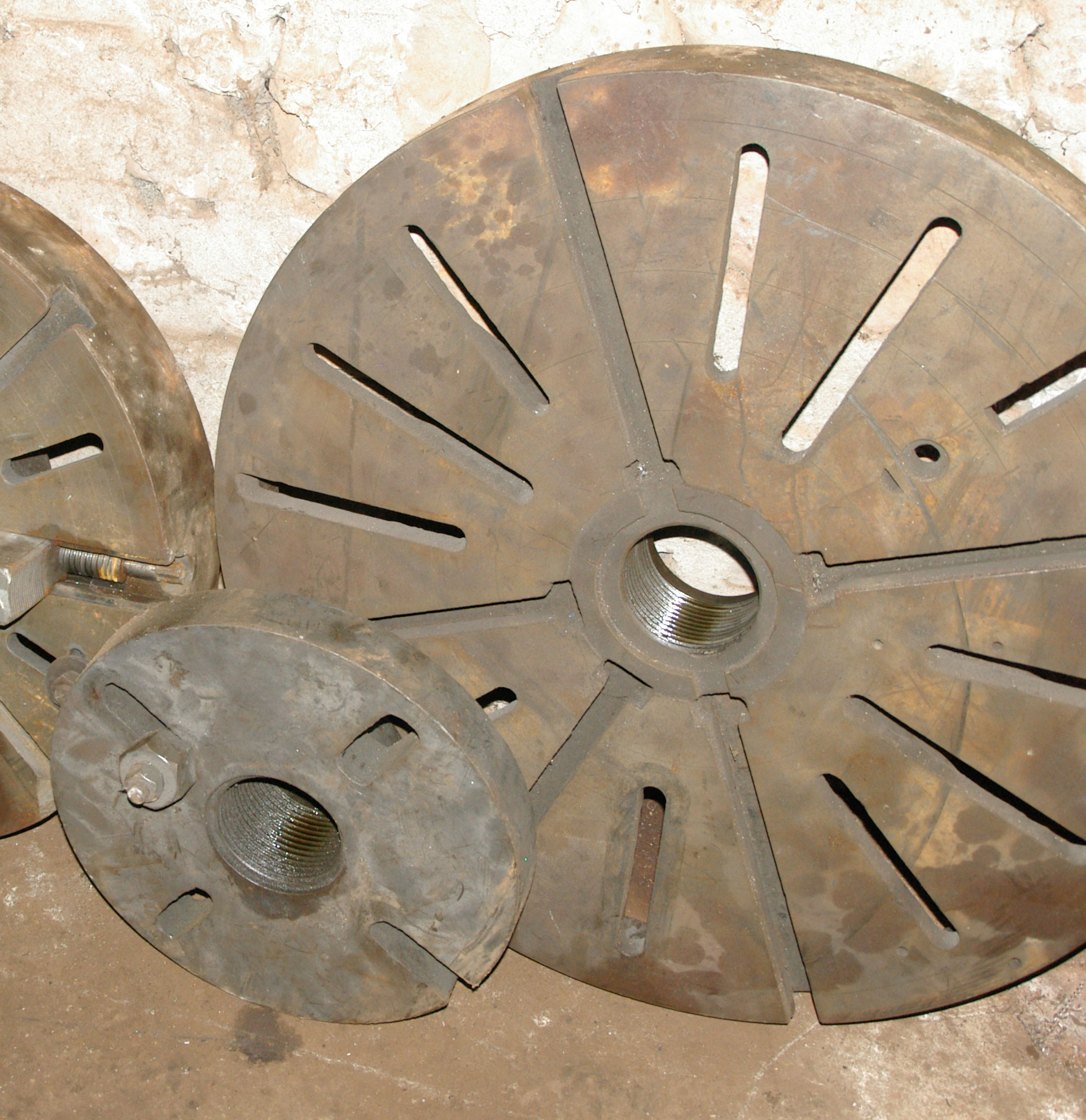
Dog plate and conventional plate

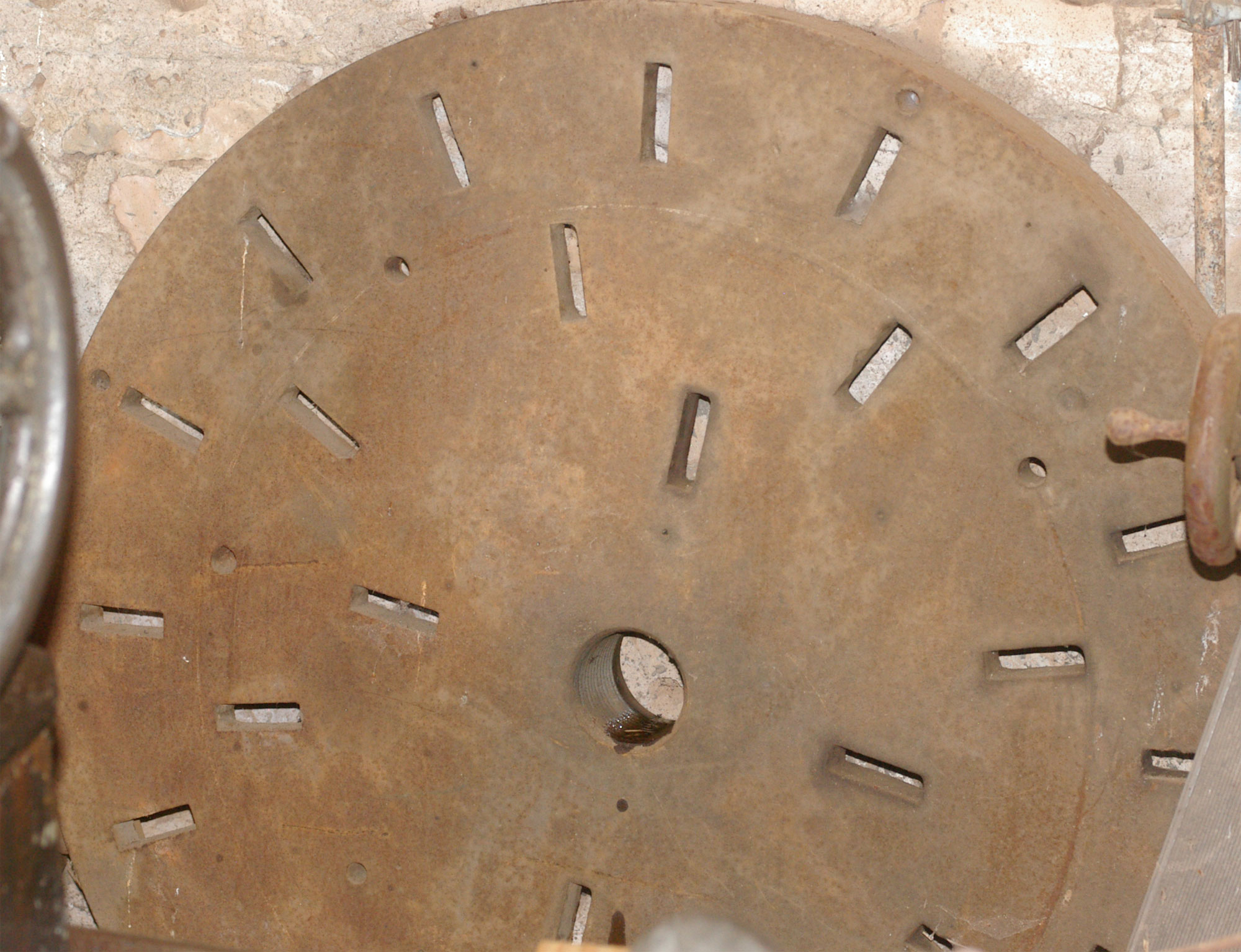
Unusual slotted faceplate

A lathe faceplate is a basic workholding accessory for a wood or metal turning lathe. It is a circular metal (usually cast iron) plate which fixes to the end of the lathe spindle. The workpiece is then clamped to the faceplate, typically using t-slot nuts in slots in the faceplate, or less commonly threaded holes in the faceplate itself.

The faceplate may be attached to the lathe in several ways: the two most common are a thread and a precision cone arrangement, and threaded studs and a circular recess fitting a flange on the end of the spindle. Increasingly common is the camlock arrangement, in which shaped studs and cams replace threaded studs for rapid exchanging of the faceplate with other accessories, such as three or four jaw chucks.

The faceplate was the ancestor of lathe chucks, an arrangement of three or more adjustable 'dogs' bolted to the faceplate providing a primitive chuck arrangement. The smaller plate in the upper photo is specifically a 'dog face' with slots intended to hold a bent tail dog while the work itself was supported on centers. The larger plate to the right simply provides a variety of ways by which work can be bolted or clamped to the plate. The slotted plate on the lower photo accepts wedged holders which can be used to fasten the work to the plate. The plates were expendable, so it was not unusual as shown in both photos for a machinist to drill additional holes in the plates for attaching work that could not otherwise be attached. While the dog plates were usually fairly small regardless of the lathe size, the classic face plate is usually matched to the maximum diameter that the lathe will swing.

It may seem that a faceplate is a primitive accessory superseded by precision chucks, but its inherent flexibility (almost any shape can be attached to a faceplate with care and the right fixings) and the possibility of achieving great accuracy by careful setup make it essential for a well equipped lathe.

For certain specialist jobs, temporary or special faceplates can be made, perhaps in wood or light alloy, that can be machined or adapted for difficult workholding jobs. One example might be attaching thin sheet metal to a wooden faceplate using wood screws, allowing the trepanning of holes, with the tool cutting into the sacrificial faceplate material.

== See also ==
- Lathe carrier
- Angle plate
