= Tablet press =

Machine for producing tablets

A tablet press in operation

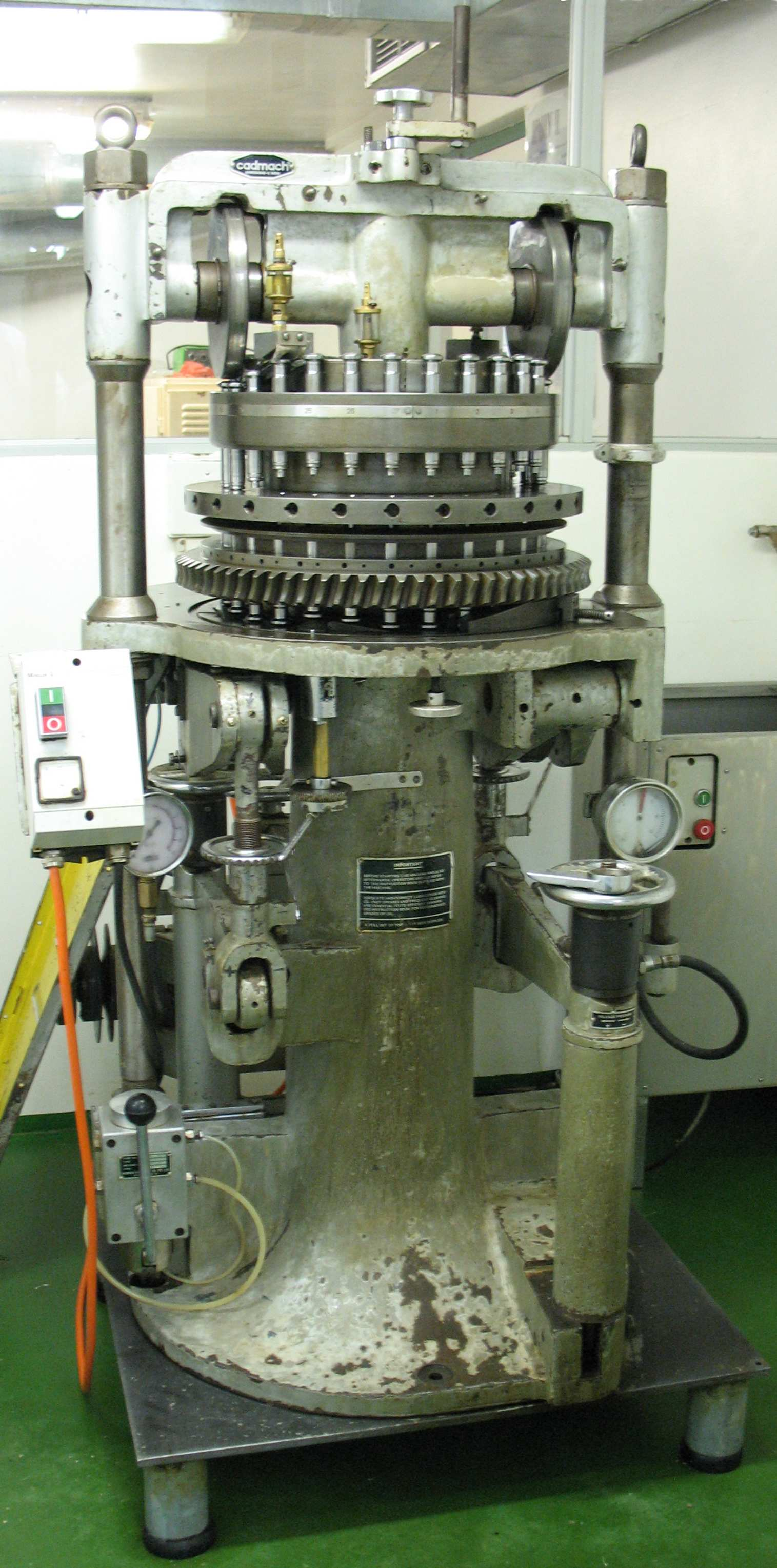
An old rotary tablet press

A tablet press is a mechanical device that compresses powder into tablets of uniform size and weight. A tablet press can be used to manufacture tablets of a wide variety of materials, including pharmaceuticals, nutraceuticals, cleaning products, industrial pellets and cosmetics. To form a tablet, the granulated powder material must be metered into a cavity formed by two punches and a die, and then the punches must be pressed together with great force to fuse the material together.

A tablet is formed by the combined pressing action of two punches and a die. In the first step of a typical operation, the bottom punch is lowered in the die creating a cavity into which the granulated feedstock is fed. The exact depth of the lower punch can be precisely controlled to meter the amount of powder that fills the cavity. The excess is scraped from the top of the die, and the lower punch is drawn down and temporarily covered to prevent spillage. Then, the upper punch is brought down into contact with the powder as the cover is removed. The force of compression is delivered by high pressure compression rolls which fuse the granulated material together into a hard tablet. After compression, the lower punch is raised to eject the tablet.

Tablet tooling design is critical to ensuring a robust tablet compression process. Considerations when designing pharmaceutical tablet compression tool design include tooling set, head flat, top head angle, top head radius, head back angle, and punch shank. As well as ensuring a single dose of drug, the tablet tooling is also critical in ensuring the size, shape, embossing and other physical characteristics of the tablet that are required for identification.

There are 2 types of tablet presses: single-punch and rotary tablet presses. Most high-speed tablet presses take the form of a rotating turret that holds any number of punches. As they rotate around the turret, the punches come into contact with cams which control the punch's vertical position. Punches and dies are usually custom made for each application, and can be made in a wide variety of sizes, shapes, and can be customized with manufacturer codes and scoring lines to make tablets easier to break. Depending on tablet size, shape, material, and press configuration, a typical modern press can produce from 250,000 to over 1,700,000 tablets an hour.

== See also ==
- Tablet (pharmacy)
