= Lathe dog =

Mechanical component of a lathe

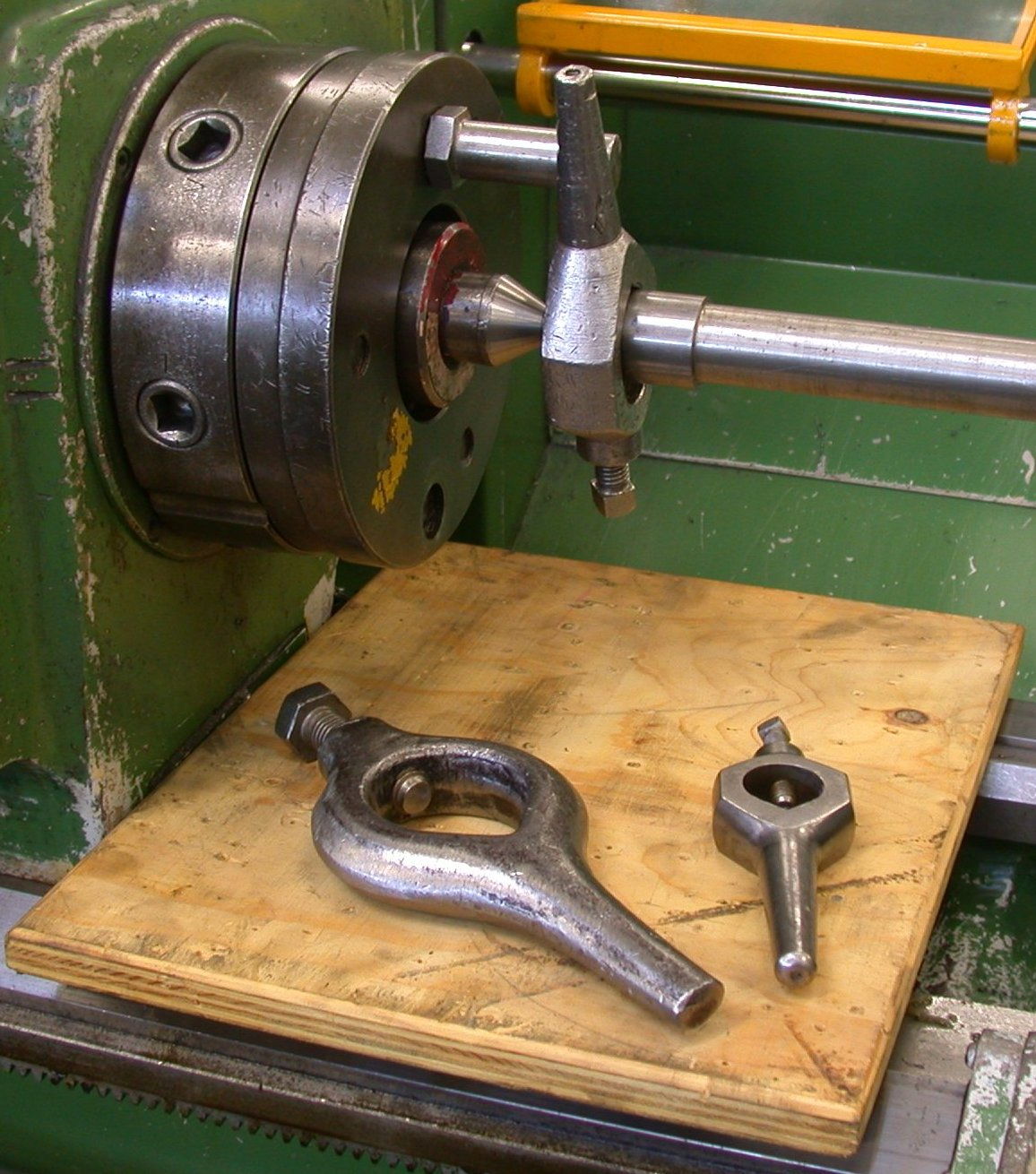
Straight tail lathe dogs. A setup is shown with faceplate, drive stud, headstock center, dog and workpiece.

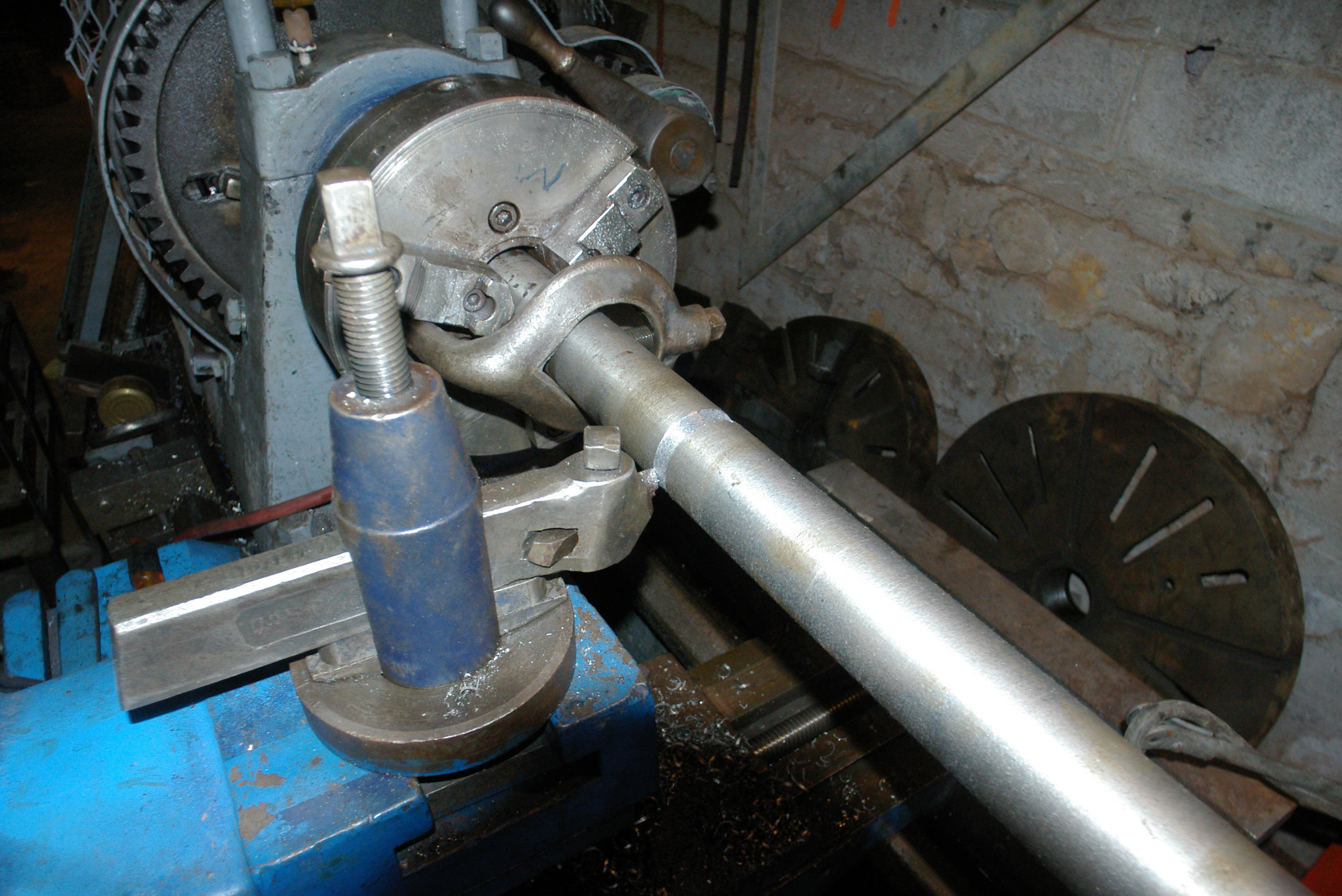
Bent tail lathe dog hooked on chuck jaw

A lathe dog is a mechanical device typically made of cast iron, steel or aluminum that transmits rotary motion from a faceplate to a workpiece mounted between centers in a lathe. The tail of the dog is rotated by a slot in a driving faceplate, a stud mounted on a faceplate, or sometimes a side of a chuck jaw. The workpiece passes through an aperture in the dog into which the work is secured by one or more setscrews or a clamp arrangement. The maximum cross sectional dimension of the workpiece is limited by the dimensions of the dog aperture. Lathe dogs are provided in straight tail or bent tail form, and may be single tail or double tail. A lathe dog designed to hold square, rectangular or odd-shaped work and having a moveable portion secured typically by two cap screws is called a clamp dog. Bent tail dogs are able to engage directly with a driving faceplate slot or a chuck jaw but can crowd work off centre if clearance is not present between the dog tail and a closed end of the faceplate slot. Straight tail dogs do not present the issue of crowding work off centre but require at least one driving stud to be mounted on the faceplate. If the rotating mass of the dog setup is not balanced, eccentric motion of the work may occur. Counterbalancing or reduced spindle speed may be required. Care must be taken by the operator when using lathe dogs, as it is easy to get snagged on one. Use of headless setscrews, preferably of multiple-spline drive design, that do not protrude above the outer surface of the dog is recommended. A lathe dog may also be used with some indexing heads and other tools with similar faceplates that turn about a center.

== See also ==
- Lathe faceplate
- Mandrel

== Patents ==
- U.S. patent 108,325—Buss, Charles. Improvement in lathe-dogs
