= Nailset =

Tool used for driving nail heads below the surface of a piece of wood

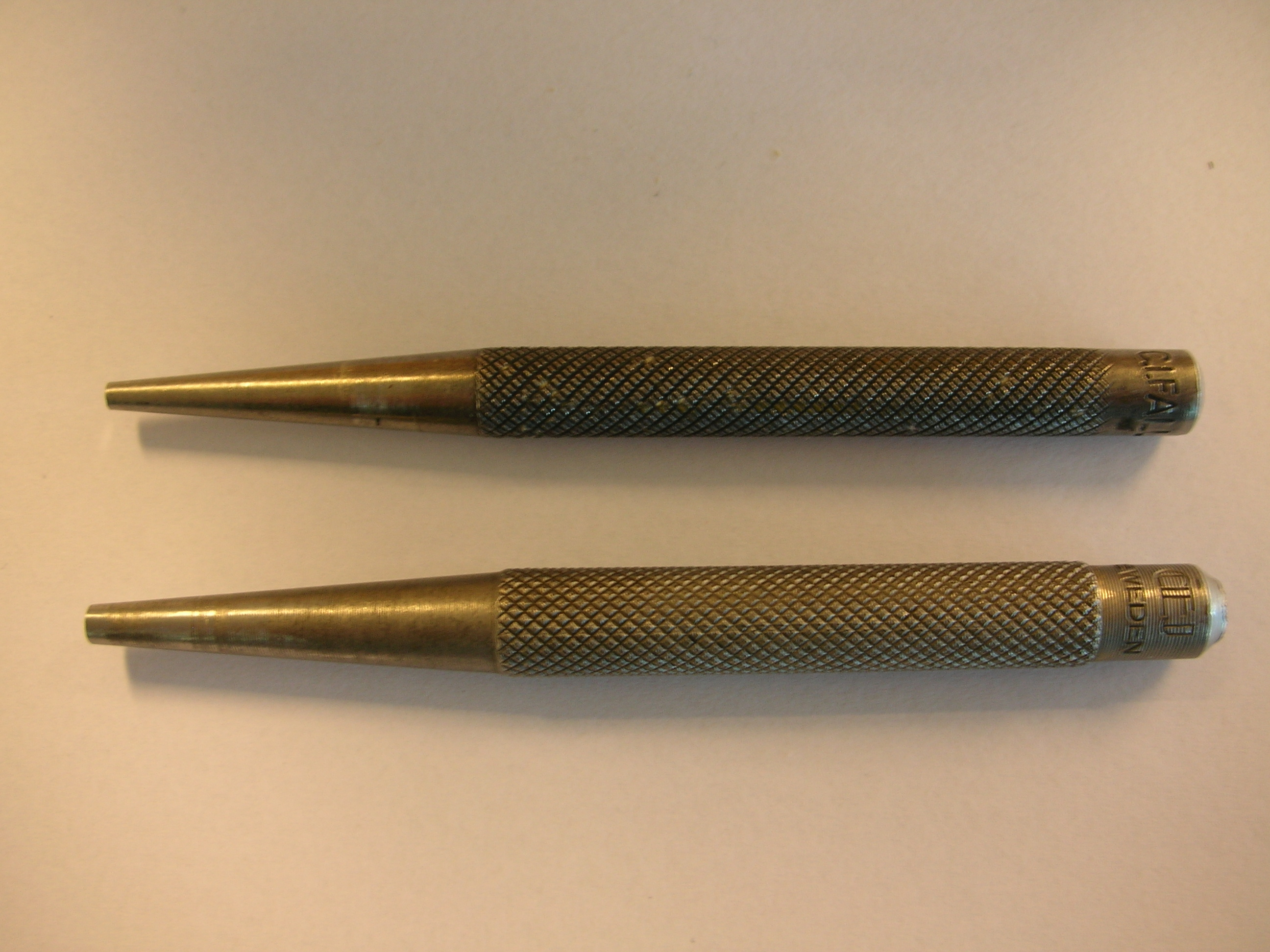
- A pair of nailsets with different sized tips
- Other names: Nail punch; Nail set; Pin punch

A nailset or nail punch is a hand tool used for driving the exposed head of a nail or pin below the surface of a piece of wood, such as when installing decorative moulding or face-fastening wood flooring.

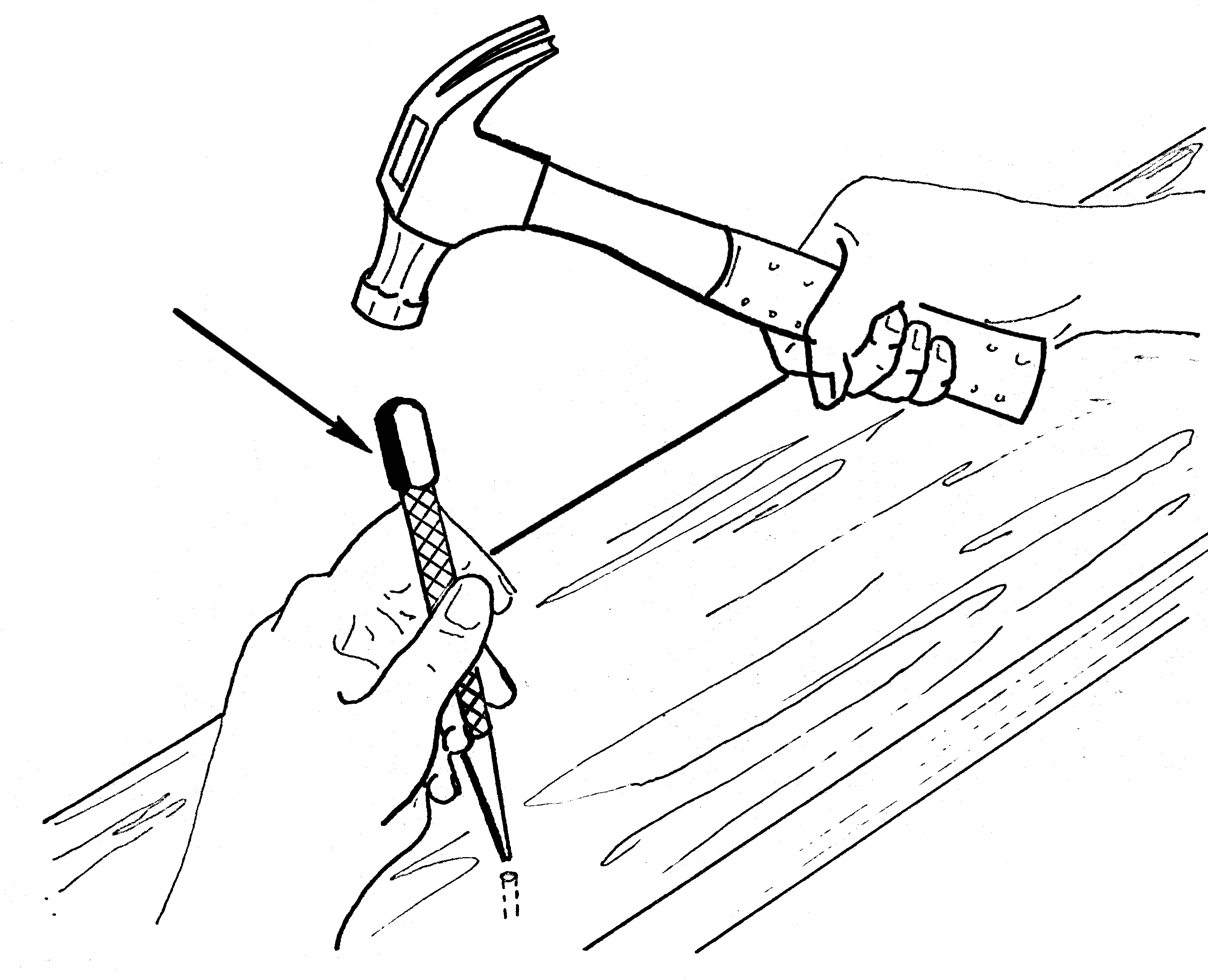
Nailset usage

Though they vary in design, nailsets are typically made from a hard round or square steel rod which tapers at one end to a flat or slightly hollowed tip. The tip is placed against the head of the nail, while the other end of the nailset is struck with a hammer. Nailsets come with different sized tips suited to different sized nail heads.

== See also ==
- Punch (tool)
