= Marking blue =

Layout stain used in metalworking

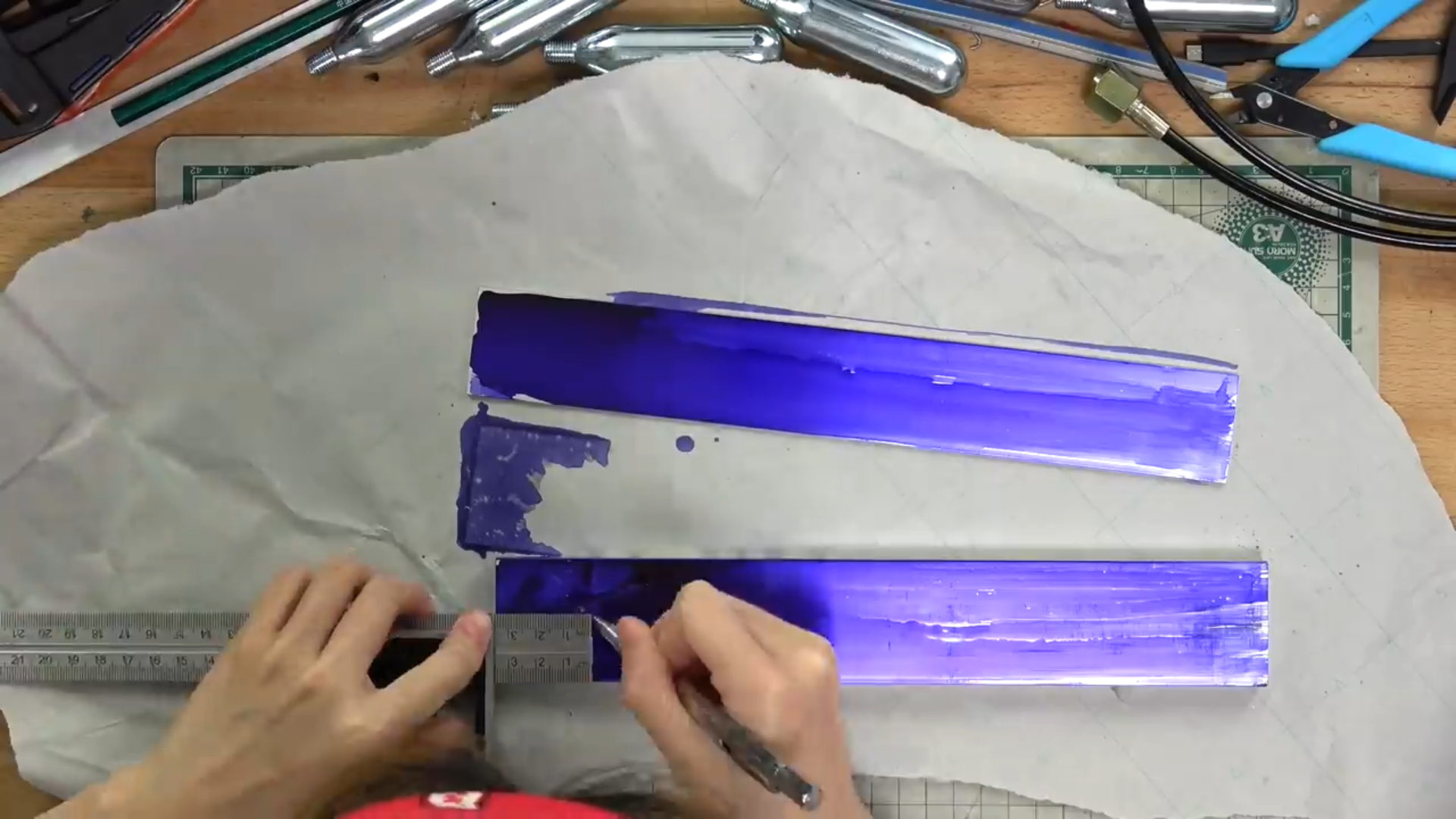
Marking out a metal bar

Marking blue or layout stain (sometimes called Dykem after trademark erosion of a popular brand, or Prussian blue after the blue pigment) is a dye used in metalworking to aid in marking out rough parts for further machining. It is used to stain or paint a metal object with a very thin layer of dye that can be scratched off using a scriber or other sharp instrument to reveal a bright, yet very narrow line in the metal underneath.

== Composition ==
Marking blue is made by mixing methylated spirits with shellac and gentian violet.

== Alternatives ==
A felt tip marker can be used as they are convenient and tend not to dry up as quickly. On rough structures, such as castings or forgings, whitewash or a mixture of chalk and water can be used. A solution of copper sulfate, distilled water, and a few drops of sulfuric acid can be used on machined surfaces.
