= Tube drawing =

Industrial processes

Tube drawing is a process to size a tube by shrinking a large diameter tube into a smaller one, by drawing the tube through a die. This process produces high-quality tubing with precise dimensions, good surface finish, and the added strength of cold working. For this reason this process is established for many materials, mainly metalworking but also glass. Because it is so versatile, tube drawing is suitable for both large- and small-scale production. The large-scale production of glass typically uses a one step process where glass is directly drawn into a tube from a melting tank.

There are five types of tube drawing: tube sinking, mandrel drawing, stationary mandrel, moving mandrel, and floating mandrel. A mandrel is used in many of the types to prevent buckling or wrinkling in the workpiece.

== Processes ==
=== Tube sinking ===
Tube sinking, also known as free tube drawing, reduces the diameter of the tube without a mandrel inside the tube. The inner diameter is determined by the inner and outer diameter of the stock tube, the outer diameter of the final product, the length of the die landing, the amount of back tension, and the friction between the tube and the die. This type of drawing operation is the most economical, especially on thick-walled tubes and tubes smaller than 12 mm (0.47 in) in diameter, but does not give the best surface finish. As the tube thickness increases, the surface finish quality decreases. This process is often used for the tubing on low-cost lawn furniture.

=== Rod drawing ===
Rod drawing is the process that draws the tube with a mandrel inside the tube; the mandrel is drawn with the tube. The advantage to this process is that the mandrel defines the inner diameter and the surface finish and has a quick setup time for short runs. The disadvantages are that lengths are limited by the length of the mandrel, usually no more than 100 feet (30 m), and that a second operation is required to remove the mandrel, called reeling. This type of process is usually used on heavy walled or small (inner diameter) tubes. Common applications include super-high pressure tubing and hydraulic tubing (with the addition of a finishing tube sinking operation). This process is also used for precision manufacturing of trombone handslides.

=== Fixed plug drawing ===
Fixed plug drawing, also known as stationary mandrel drawing, uses a mandrel at the end of the die to shape the inner diameter of the tube. This process is slow and the area reductions are limited, but it gives the best inner surface finish of any of the processes. This is the oldest tube drawing method.

=== Floating plug drawing ===
Floating plug drawing, also known as floating mandrel drawing, uses a mandrel that is not anchored whatsoever to shape the inner diameter of the tube. The mandrel is held in by the friction forces between the mandrel and the tube. This axial force is given by friction and pressure. The greatest advantage of this is that it can be used on extremely long lengths, sometimes up to 1,000 feet (300 m). The disadvantage is it requires a precise design otherwise it will give inadequate results. This process is often used for oil-well tubing.

=== Tethered plug drawing ===
Tethered plug drawing, also known as semi-floating mandrel drawing, is a mix between floating plug drawing and fixed plug drawing. The mandrel is allowed to float, but is still anchored via a tether. This process gives similar results to the floating plug process, except that it is designed for straight tubes. It gives a better inner surface finish than rod drawing.

== See also ==
- Pipe and tube bender
- Wire drawing

== Bibliography ==
- Degarmo, E. Paul; Black, J T.; Kohser, Ronald A. (2003), Materials and Processes in Manufacturing (9th ed.), Wiley, ISBN 0-471-65653-4.
