= Angle plate =

Metal work holding tool

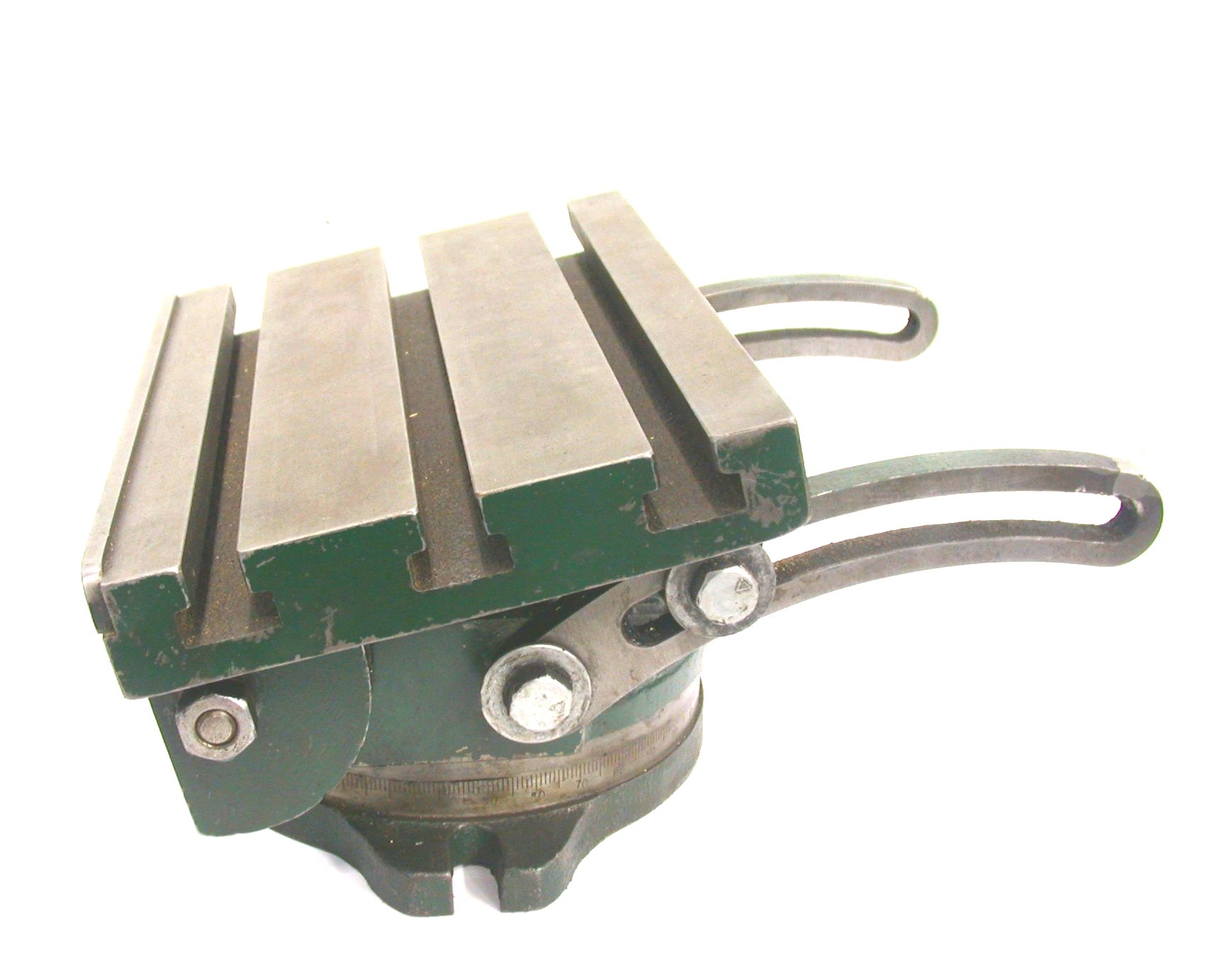
Adjustable angle plate

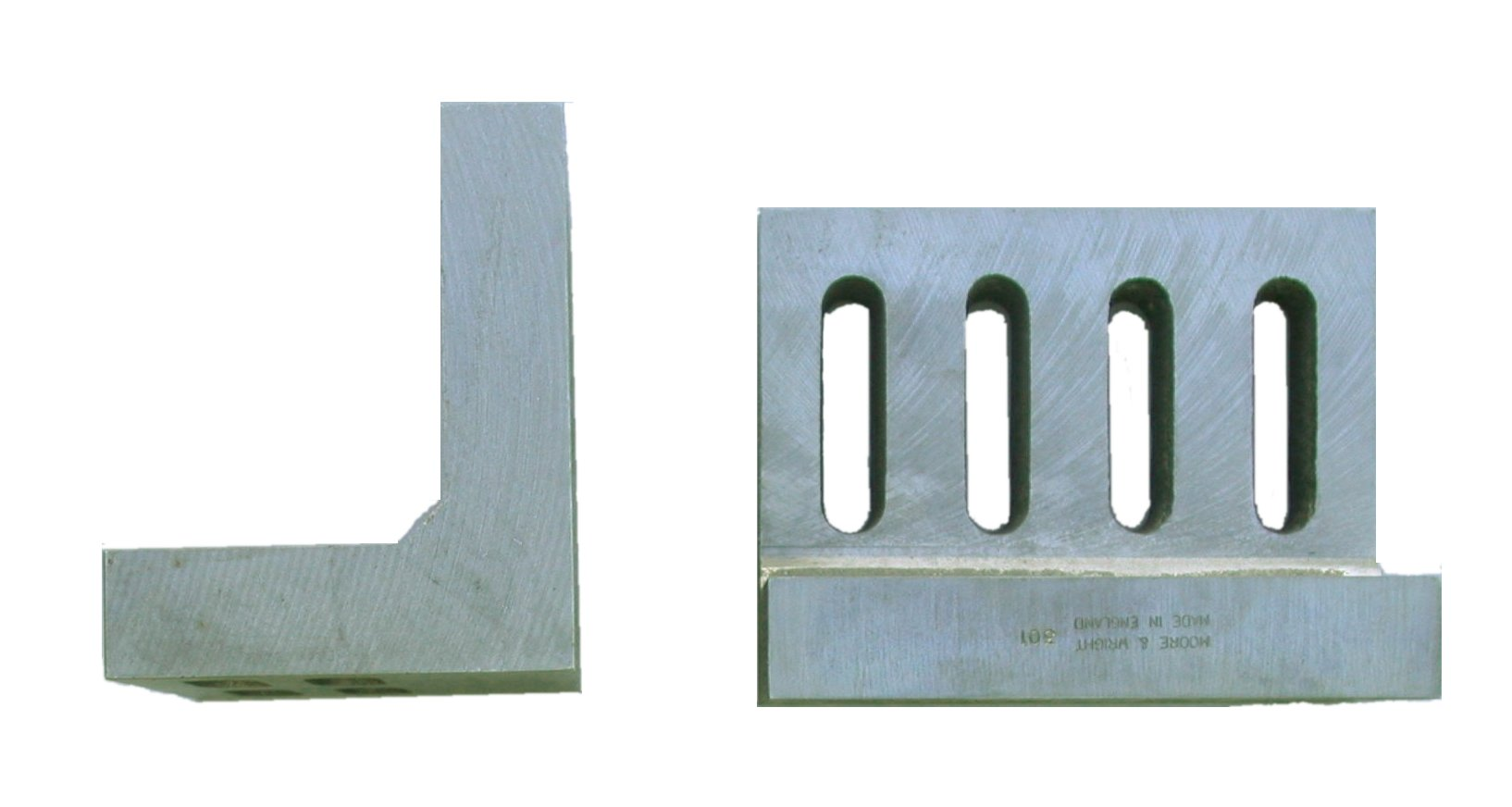
Fixed angle plate

An angle plate is a work holding device used as a fixture in metalworking, including grinding.

Angle plates are used to hold workpieces square to the table during marking out operations. Adjustable angle plates are also available for workpieces that need to be inclined, usually towards a milling cutter. Angle plates are made from high-quality material (generally spheroidal cast iron) that has been stabilized to prevent further movement or distortion. Slotted holes or "T" bolt slots are machined into the surfaces to enable the secure attachment or clamping of workpieces to the plate, and the plate to the worktable.

The knee type angle plate is typically used for grinding work.

== See also ==
- Lathe faceplate
