= ASME Y14.5 =

American engineering standard

ASME Y14.5 is a standard published by the American Society of Mechanical Engineers (ASME) to establish rules, symbols, definitions, requirements, defaults, and recommended practices for stating and interpreting geometric dimensioning and tolerancing (GD&T). ASME/ANSI issued the first version of this Y-series standard in 1973.

== Overview ==
ASME Y14.5 is a complete definition of geometric dimensioning and tolerancing. It contains 15 sections which cover symbols and datums as well as tolerances of form, orientation, position, profile and runout. It is complemented by ASME Y14.5.1 - Mathematical Definition of Dimensioning and Tolerancing Principles. Together these standards allow for clear and concise detailing of dimensional requirements on a product drawing or electronic drawing package as well as the verification of the requirements on manufactured parts. Effective application of Geometric dimensioning and tolerancing (GD&T) allows for parts to be verified by dimensional measurements, gauging, or by coordinate-measuring machine (CMM).

== History ==
The modern standard can trace its roots to the military standard MIL-STD-8 published in 1949. It was revised by MIL-STD-8A in 1953, which introduced the concept of modern GD&T "Rule 1". Further revisions have continued to add new concepts and address new technology like computer aided design and model-based definition. A list of revisions follows:

ASME Y14.5-2018, "Dimensioning and Tolerancing"
Current Standard
Preceded by ASME Y14.5-2009

ASME Y14.5-2-2017, "Certification of Geometric Dimensioning and Tolerancing Professionals"
Current Standard
Preceded by ASME Y14.5-2-2000

ASME Y14.5-2009
Succeeded by ASME Y14.5-2018
Preceded by ASME Y14.5M-1994

ASME Y14.5M-1994
Succeeded by ASME Y14.5-2009
Reaffirmed in 2004
Preceded by ANSI Y14.5M-1982

ANSI Y14.5M-1982
Preceded by ANSI Y14.5-1973
Reaffirmed in 1988

ANSI Y14.5-1973
Succeeded by ASME Y14.5M-1982
Preceded by USASI Y14.5-1966

USASI Y14.5-1966
Succeeded by ANSI Y14.5-1973
Preceded by ASA Y14.5-1957

ASA Y14.5-1957
Succeeded by USASI Y14.5-1966
Preceded by ASA Z14.1 Series

== See also ==
- Geometric dimensioning and tolerancing
- CAD standards
