= Total indicator reading =

Maximum range of an indicator

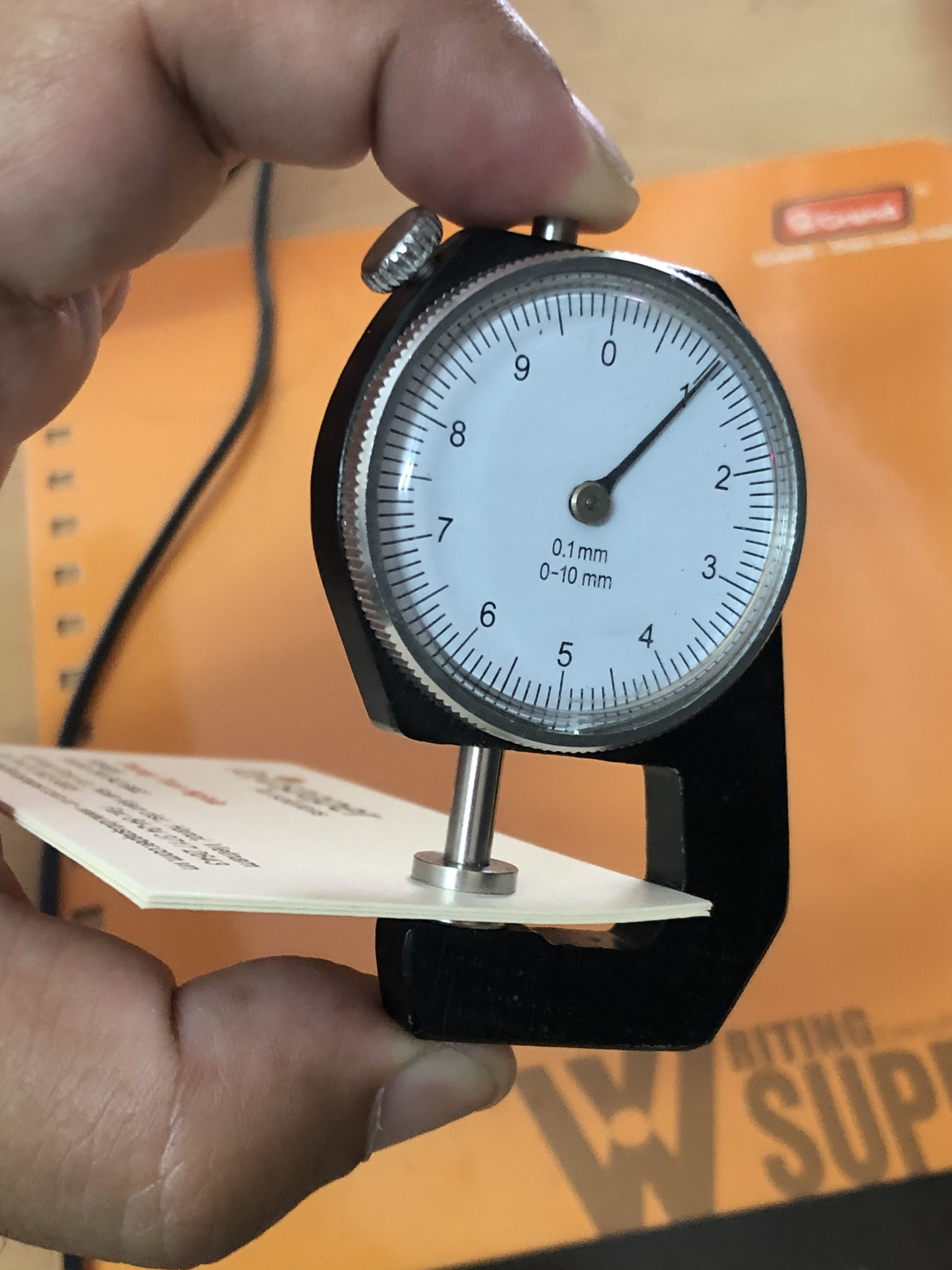
An indicator used to measure thickness

Technical symbol for total run-out

In metrology and the fields that it serves (such as manufacturing, machining, and engineering), total indicator reading (TIR), also known by the newer name full indicator movement (FIM), is the difference between the maximum and minimum measurements (the range), that is, readings of an indicator, on the planar, cylindrical, or contoured surface of a part, showing its amount of deviation from flatness, roundness (circularity), cylindricity, concentricity with other cylindrical features, or similar conditions. The indicator traditionally would be a dial indicator; today dial-type and digital indicators coexist.

The earliest expansion of "TIR" was total indicated run-out and concerned cylindrical or tapered (conical) parts, where "run-out" (noun) refers to any imperfection of form that causes a rotating part such as a shaft to "run out" (verb), that is, to not rotate with perfect smoothness. These conditions include being out-of-round (that is, lacking sufficient roundness); eccentricity (that is, lacking sufficient concentricity); or being bent axially (regardless of whether the surfaces are perfectly round and concentric at every cross-sectional point). The purpose of emphasizing the "total" in TIR was to duly maintain the distinction between per-side differences and both-sides-considered differences, which requires perennial conscious attention in lathe work. For example, all depths of cut in lathe work must account for whether they apply to the radius (that is, per side) or to the diameter (that is, total). Similarly, in shaft-straightening operations, where calibrated amounts of bending force are applied laterally to the shaft, the "total" emphasis corresponds to a bend of half that magnitude. If a shaft has 0.1 mm TIR, it is "out of straightness" by half that total, i.e., 0.05 mm.

Today TIR in its more inclusive expansion, "total indicator reading", concerns all kinds of features, from round to flat to contoured. One example of how the "total" emphasis can apply to flat surfaces as well as round ones is in the topic of surface roughness, where both peaks and valleys count toward an assessment of the magnitude of roughness. Statistical methods such as root mean square (RMS) duly address the "total" idea in this respect.

The newer name "full indicator movement" (FIM) was coined to emphasize the requirement of zero cosine error. Whereas dial test indicators will give a foreshortened reading if their tips are on an angle to the surface being measured (cosine error), a drawing callout of FIM is defined as referring to the distance traveled by the extremity of the tip—not by the lesser amount that its lever-like action moves the needle. Thus a FIM requirement is only met when the measured part itself is truly in geometric compliance—not merely when the needle sweeps a certain arc of the dial.

The "TIR" abbreviation is still more widely known and used than "FIM". This is natural given that (1) many part designs that are still being manufactured are made from decades-old engineering drawings, which still say "TIR"; and (2) generations of machinists were trained with the term "TIR", whereas only recent curriculum uses "FIM".

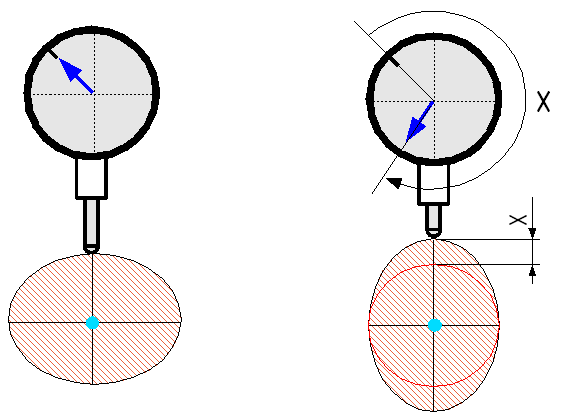
Measuring roundness

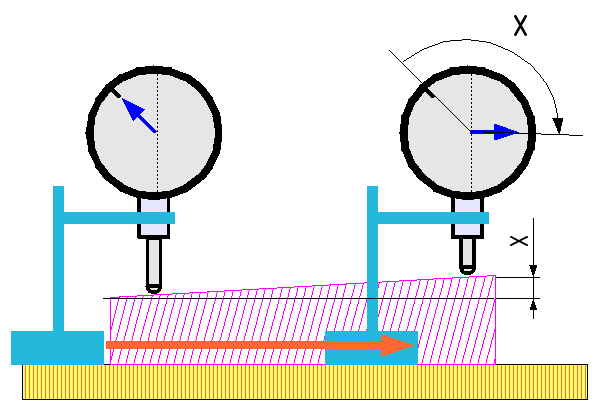
Measuring flatness

== See also ==
- Flatness (manufacturing)
- Geometric dimensioning and tolerancing
- Engineering drawing
