= Speed wobble =

Physics phenomenon affecting two wheeled vehicles

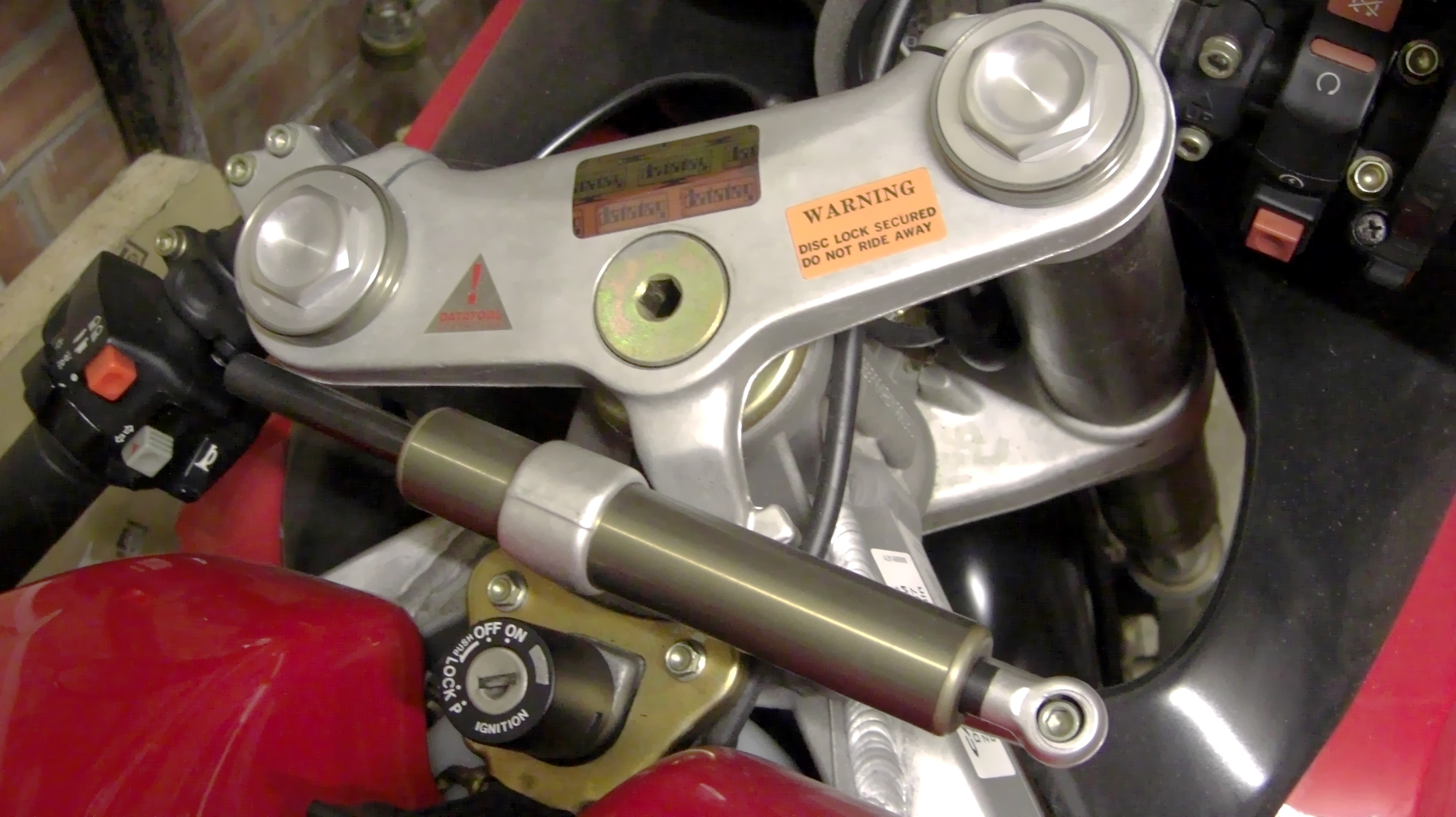
Steering damper mounted on a motorcycle to reduce speed wobble

Speed wobble (also known as shimmy, tank-slapper, or death wobble) is a rapid side-to-side shaking of a vehicle's wheel(s) that occurs at high speeds and can lead to loss of control. It presents as a quick (4–10 Hz) oscillation of primarily the steerable wheel(s), and is caused by a combination of factors, including initial disturbances and insufficient damping, which can create a resonance effect. Initially, the rest of the vehicle remains mostly unaffected, until translated into a vehicle yaw oscillation of increasing amplitude, producing loss of control.

Vehicles that can experience this oscillation include motorcycles and bicycles, skateboards, and, in theory, any vehicle with a single steering pivot point and a sufficient amount of freedom of the steered wheel, including that which exists on some light aircraft with tricycle gear where instability can occur at speeds of less than 80 km/h (50 mph); this does not include most automobiles. The initial instability occurs mostly at high speeds and is similar to that experienced by shopping cart wheels and aircraft landing gear.

== Theory ==
Sustained oscillation has two necessary components: an underdamped second- or higher-order system and a positive feedback mechanism. An example of an underdamped second order system is a spring–mass system, where the mass can bob up and down (oscillate) when hanging from a spring.

If shimmy cannot be designed out of the system, a device known as a steering damper may be used, which is essentially a notch filter designed to damp the shimmy at its known natural frequency.

Shimmy is usually associated with the deformation of (rubber) tires. However, it can also be observed in nondeformable (e.g., steel) wheels. The phenomenon can be explained by introducing multicomponent dry friction forces, apart from the usual forces considered in the literature.

Another explanation is that speed wobble is a Hopf bifurcation, a mathematical phenomenon in which a stable fixed point of a dynamical system loses stability as a parameter changes, giving rise to a limit cycle (a path that a system follows repeatedly, looping back on itself in a predictable pattern, which other nearby behaviors tend to mimic over time). In the case of a speed wobble, the system changes from one state (a stable ride) to a second state, (constant amplitude oscillation), when one parameter (forward speed, or air speed) progresses through a critical point.

== In two-wheeled vehicles ==
Wobble or shimmy begins when some otherwise minor irregularity accelerates the wheel to one side. The irregularity may be a wheel which is out-of-round, out-of-true, or out-of-balance. As the wheel rotates, it will exert a cyclic load to the vehicle frame, which if matched with the system's (vehicle and attached accessories) resonant frequency, can produce a speed wobble. During the wheel rotation, a restoring force is applied in phase with the progress of the irregularity, and the wheel turns to the other side where the process is repeated. If there is insufficient damping in the steering the oscillation will increase until system failure. The oscillation frequency can be changed by changing the forward speed, making the bike stiffer or lighter, or increasing the stiffness of the steering, of which the rider is a main component. While wobble or shimmy can be easily remedied by adjusting speed, position, or grip on the handlebar, it can be fatal if left uncontrolled.

Other things being equal, speed wobble is generally less likely to occur in a mountain bike compared to a road bike, because a mountain bike's frame generally has more damping from the suspension system, and the tire knobs also produce some damping between the vehicle and road interface.

Since shimmy frequency is independent of bike speed, gyroscopic effects "are clearly not essential to the phenomenon." The top five influences on wobble have been found to be lateral stiffness of the front tire, steering damper, height of bike center of mass, distance of bike center of mass from rear wheel, and cornering stiffness of the front tire.

An academic paper that investigated wobble through physical experimentation and computer modeling concludes: "the influence on wobble mode of front tire characteristics, front frame inertia and chassis stiffness were shown. In particular, it shows that [by] increasing front tire inflation, chassis stiffness, and front frame inertia about steering axis and decreasing sideslip stiffness of front tire, wobble mode damping is improved, promoting vehicle stability."

== In single-wheeled mobility devices ==
Speed wobbles occur on electric unicycles (EUC) and single-wheeled skateboards (such as Onewheel). "To fix Onewheel wobbles, both feet need to be repositioned by inching them to a position that properly provides a center of gravity. The Onewheel’s controller is designed to only balance the board from front-to-back having no control of the side-to-side movement."

== See also ==
- Bicycle and motorcycle dynamics
- Caster flutter
- Fishtailing
- Hunting oscillation
- Pilot-induced oscillation
- Self-oscillation
- Tire balance
- Trailer (vehicle)
- Vehicle dynamics
