= Datum reference =

Point of reference against which some others are calculated

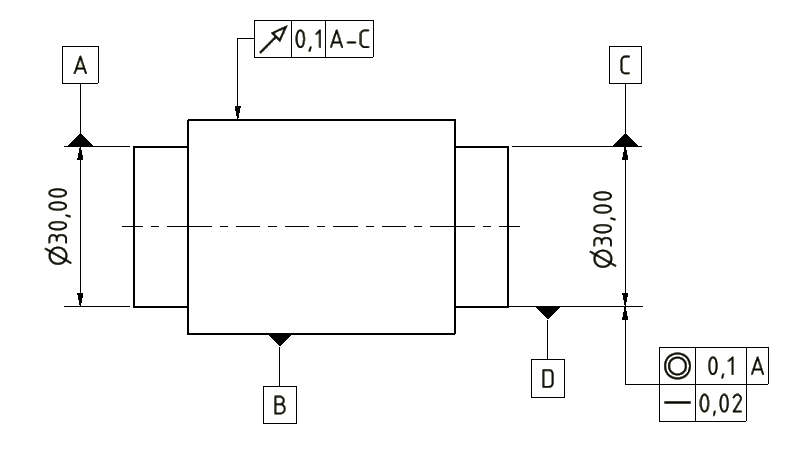
Technical drawing with references and geometric specifications

A datum reference or just datum (plural: datums (Note: The plural of this sense of the word datum is datums by convention, in contrast with the other senses of the word in which data usually serves as both the plural form and the mass noun counterpart.))) is some geometrically important part of an object, such as a point, line, plane, hole, set of holes, or pair of surfaces. It serves as a reference in defining the geometry of the object and (often) in measuring aspects of the actual geometry to assess how closely they match with the nominal value, which may be an ideal, standard, average, or desired value.

For example, on a car's wheel, the lug nut holes define a bolt circle that is a datum from which the location of the rim can be defined and measured. This matters because the hub and rim need to be concentric to within close limits (or else the wheel will not roll smoothly).

The concept of datums is used in many fields, including carpentry, metalworking, needlework, geometric dimensioning and tolerancing (GD&T), aviation, surveying, geodesy (geodetic datums), and others.

== Uses ==
In carpentry, an alternative, more common name is "face side" and "face edge". The artisan nominates two straight edges on a workpiece as the "datum edges", and they are marked accordingly. One convention is to mark the first datum edge with a single slanted line (/) and the second with double lines (//). For most work, the datum references of the workpiece need to be square. If necessary they may be cut, planed or filed to make them so. In subsequent marking out, all measurements are then taken from either of the two datum references.

In aviation, an aircraft is designed to operate within a specified range of mass and (chiefly longitudinal) balance; an airman is responsible for determining these factors for each flight under their command. This requires the calculation of moment for each variable mass in the aircraft (fuel, passengers, cargo, etc.), by multiplying its weight by its distance from a datum reference. The datum for light airplanes is usually the engine firewall or the tip of the spinner, but in all cases it is a fixed plane perpendicular to the aircraft's longitudinal axis, and specified in its operating handbook.

== Engineering ==
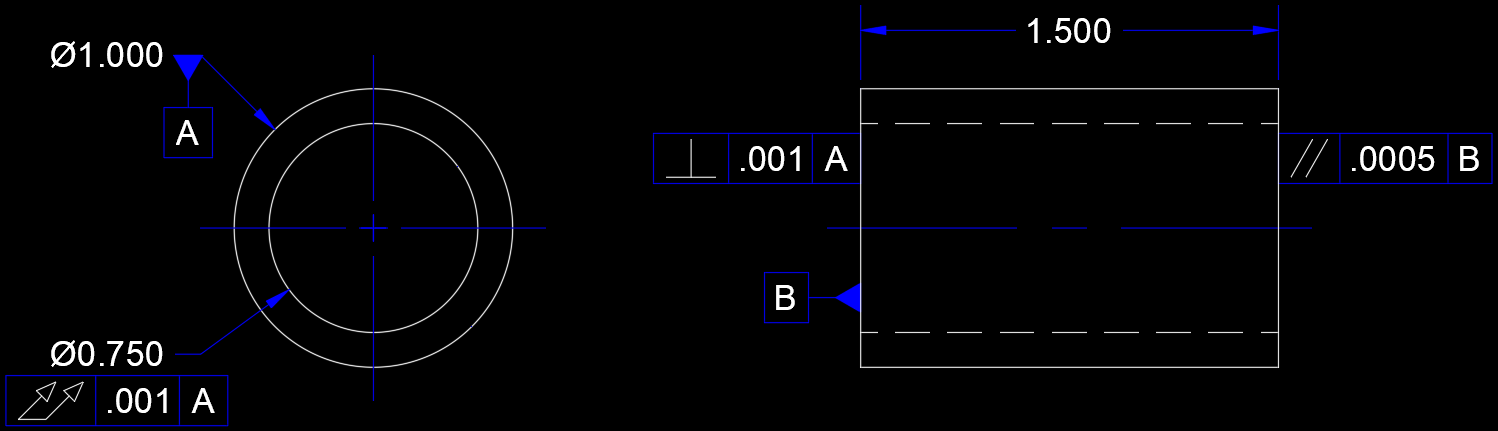
Screenshot from AutoCAD with various geometric dimensioning and tolerancing datum reference symbols (total indicator reading, perpendicularity, and parallelism

An engineering datum used in geometric dimensioning and tolerancing is a feature on an object used to create a reference system for measurement. In engineering and drafting, a datum is a reference point, surface, or axis on an object against which measurements are made.

These are then referred to by one or more 'datum references' which indicate measurements that should be made with respect to the corresponding datum feature .

In geometric dimensioning and tolerancing, datum reference frames are typically 3D. Datum reference frames are used as part of the feature control frame to show where the measurement is taken from. A typical datum reference frame is made up of three planes. For example, the three planes could be one "face side" and two "datum edges". These three planes are marked A, B and C, where A is the face side, B is the first datum edge, and C is the second datum edge. In this case, the datum reference frame is A/B/C. A/B/C is shown at the end of feature control frame to show from where the measurement is taken. (See the ASME standard Y14.5M-2009 for more examples and material modifiers.)

The engineer selects A/B/C based on the dimensional function of the part. The datums should be functional per the ASME standard. Typically, a part is required to fit with other parts. So, the functional datums are chosen based on how the part attaches. However, typically, the functional datums are not used to manufacture the part. The manufacturing datums are typically different from the functional datums to save cost, improve process speed, and repeatability. A tolerance analysis may be needed in many cases to convert between the functional datums and the manufacturing datums. Computer software can be purchased for dimensional analysis.

There are typically 6 degrees of freedom that need to be considered before choosing which feature is A, B, or C. For this example, A is the primary datum, B is the secondary, and C is the tertiary datum. The primary datum controls the most degrees of freedom. The tertiary datum controls the least degrees of freedom. For this example, of a block of wood, datum A (the face) controls 3 degrees of freedom, B (first edge) controls 2 degrees of freedom, and C (second edge) controls 1 degree of freedom. 3+2+1 = 6, all 6 degrees of freedom are considered.

The 6 degrees of freedom in this example are 3 translation and 3 rotation about the 3D coordinate system. The face datum A controls 3: translation along the z-axis, rotation about the x-axis, and rotation about the y-axis. The edge datum B controls 2: translation along the y-axis and rotation about the z-axis. Finally, The edge datum C controls 1 degree of freedom, namely the translation along the x-axis.

== See also ==
- Datum (geodesy)
- Exact constraint
- Reference frame
- Surface plate
- Spatial reference system
