= Excedify =

Online education technology company

- Company type: Public
- Website type: Online education
- Available in: English
- Headquarters: Germany
- Area served: Worldwide
- Founder: Yaser Moharam
- Industry: E-learning
- Employees: 7-10
- Website: www.excedify.com
- Commercial: Yes
- Registration: Required
- Users: 1747 unique enrolled users, 2.8k monthly website users
- Launched: April 2022; 4 years ago
- Current status: Active

Excedify is a German educational technology (EdTech) company registered under the legal name Agamian Association UG specializing in online engineering training. The company was founded in 2022. Excedify offers self-paced certification courses for engineers, students, and technical professionals, with a focus on Geometric Dimensioning and Tolerancing (GD&T), technical drawing standards, limits and fits, and Design of Experiments (DoE).

Excedify has provided training programs that have been adopted by engineers from international industrial companies, including: Yamaha Motor Company – engineers from the manufacturing division have participated in Excedify's GD&T training. Howden Group – staff from engineering division completed courses through Excedify online certification platform. Fastech – teams from their precision manufacturing unit have enrolled in technical drawing and tolerancing training.

== History ==
Excedify was founded in 2022 by mechanical engineers who identified a gap in accessible, high-quality training resources for engineering standards and tolerancing practices. Co-founder is Yaser Moharam. The founders began by publishing visual-based GD&T tutorials and later expanded into full certification courses.

During his career in the automotive industry, Moharam worked for Brose and legget & platt and is a listed inventor on patent DE102019201802A1 and on patent EP4617118A1.

The second co-founder is Abdelrahman Ibrahim who is a simulation engineer at Brose and Amr Eldeibany a project Engineer at KSM Castings Group with experience at BMW and Trimet Aluminum SE and BMW group.

Excedify provides online certification programs in engineering disciplines, delivered through pre-recorded video modules, downloadable materials, and online assessments. Course access is typically offered on a lifetime access basis with a 30-day refund policy.

In 2023 Excedify was awarded "Best Engineering & Management eLearning Platform – Germany" by Acquisition International

Courses:

- GD&T Training and Certification (ISO GPS & ASME Y14.5) A flagship program teaching international tolerancing standards used in mechanical design and manufacturing;
- Technical Drawing - fundamentals training on projection methods, dimensioning standards, and drawing interpretation.
- Design of Experiments (DoE) - A course focused on statistical test planning and optimization methods
- Limits, Fits, and Surface Roughness Specialized modules covering ISO tolerance systems and manufacturing texture analysis.
- Excedify also offers corporate licensing and team training, allowing engineering departments to enroll multiple employees with progress tracking.
