= Geometric dimensioning and tolerancing =

System for defining and representing engineering tolerances

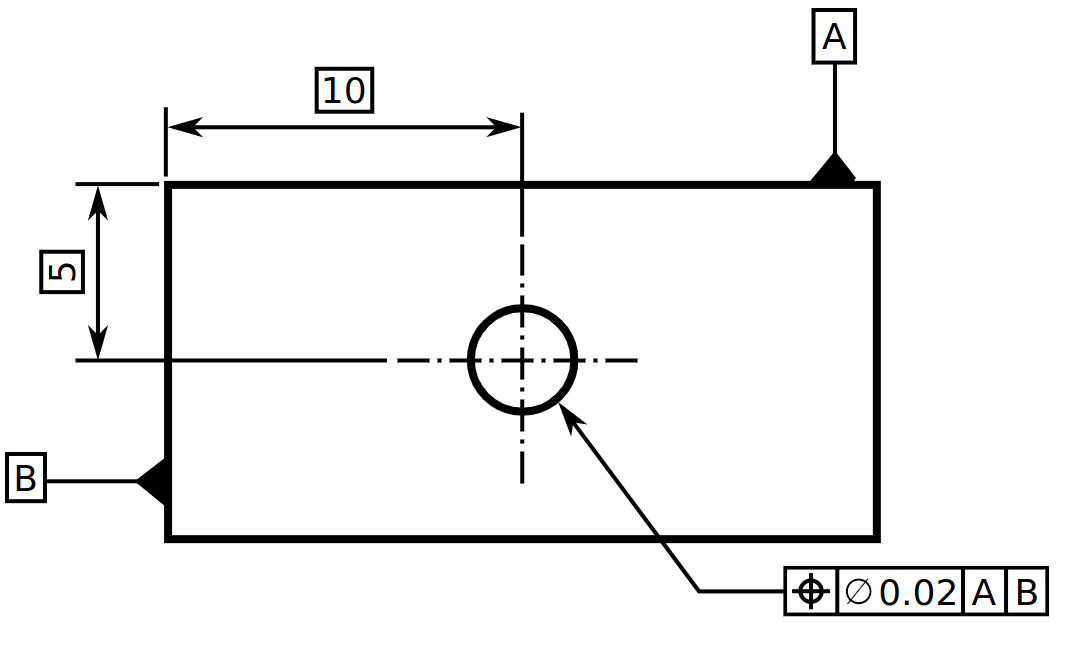
Example of true position geometric control defined by basic dimensions and datum features

Geometric dimensioning and tolerancing (GD&T) is a system for defining and communicating engineering tolerances via a symbolic language on engineering drawings and computer-generated 3D models that describes a physical object's nominal geometry and the permissible variation thereof. GD&T is used to define the nominal (theoretically perfect) geometry of parts and assemblies, the allowable variation in size, form, orientation, and location of individual features, and how features may vary in relation to one another such that a component is considered satisfactory for its intended use. Dimensional specifications define the nominal, as-modeled or as-intended geometry, while tolerance specifications define the allowable physical variation of individual features of a part or assembly.

There are several standards available worldwide that describe the symbols and define the rules used in GD&T. One such standard is American Society of Mechanical Engineers (ASME) Y14.5. This article is based on that standard. Other standards, such as those from the International Organization for Standardization (ISO), describe a different system which has some nuanced differences in its interpretation and rules (see GPS&V). The Y14.5 standard provides a fairly complete set of rules for GD&T in one document. The ISO standards, in comparison, typically only address a single topic at a time. There are separate standards that provide the details for each of the major symbols and topics below (e.g. position, flatness, profile, etc.). BS 8888 provides a self-contained document taking into account a lot of GPS&V standards.

== Origin ==
The origin of GD&T is credited to Stanley Parker, who developed the concept of "true position". While little is known about Parker's life, it is known that he worked at the Royal Torpedo Factory in Alexandria, West Dunbartonshire, Scotland. His work increased production of naval weapons by new contractors.

In 1940, Parker published Notes on Design and Inspection of Mass Production Engineering Work, the earliest work on geometric dimensioning and tolerancing. In 1956, Parker published Drawings and Dimensions, which became the basic reference in the field.

== Fundamental concepts ==
=== Dimensions ===
A dimension is defined in ASME Y14.5 as "a numerical value(s) or mathematical expression in appropriate units of measure used to define the form, size, orientation, or location, of a part or feature." Special types of dimensions include basic dimensions (theoretically exact dimensions) and reference dimensions (dimensions used to inform, not define a feature or part).

=== Units of measure ===
The units of measure in a drawing that follows GD&T can be selected by the creator of the drawing. Most often, drawings are standardized to either SI linear units, millimeters (denoted "mm"), or US customary linear units, decimal inches (denoted "IN"). Dimensions can contain only a number without units if all dimensions are the same units and there is a note on the drawing that clearly specifies what the units are.

Angular dimensions can be expressed in decimal degrees or degrees, minutes, and seconds.

=== Tolerances ===
Every feature on every manufactured part is subject to variation; therefore, the limits of allowable variation must be specified. Tolerances can be expressed directly on a dimension by limits, plus/minus tolerances, or geometric tolerances, or indirectly in tolerance blocks, notes, or tables.

Geometric tolerances are described by feature control frames, which are rectangular boxes on a drawing that indicate the type of geometric control, tolerance value, modifier(s) and/or datum(s) relevant to the feature. The type of tolerances used with symbols in feature control frames can be:

1. equal bilateral
2. unequal bilateral
3. unilateral
4. no particular distribution (a "floating" zone)

Tolerances for the profile symbols are equal bilateral unless otherwise specified, and for the position symbol tolerances are always equal bilateral. For example, the position of a hole has a tolerance of .020 inches. This means the hole can move ±.010 inches, which is an equal bilateral tolerance. It does not mean the hole can move +.015/−.005 inches, which is an unequal bilateral tolerance. Unequal bilateral and unilateral tolerances for profile are specified by adding further information to clearly show this is what is required.

=== Datums and datum references ===
A datum is a theoretically exact plane, line, point, or axis. A datum feature is a physical feature of a part identified by a datum feature symbol and corresponding datum feature triangle, e.g.,

$${\displaystyle\Box}\!\!\!\!{\scriptstyle\mathsf{A}}\!-\!\!\!-\!\!\!\blacktriangleleft\!\!\!|$$

These are then referred to by one or more 'datum references' which indicate measurements that should be made with respect to the corresponding datum feature. The datum reference frame can describe how the part fits or functions.

== Purpose and rules ==
The purpose of GD&T is to describe the engineering intent of parts and assemblies. GD&T can more accurately define the dimensional requirements for a part, allowing over 50% more tolerance zone than coordinate (or linear) dimensioning in some cases. Proper application of GD&T will ensure that the part defined on the drawing has the desired form, fit (within limits) and function with the largest possible tolerances. GD&T can add quality and reduce cost at the same time through producibility.

According to ASME Y14.5, the fundamental rules of GD&T are as follows,

1. All dimensions must have a tolerance. Plus and minus tolerances may be applied directly to dimensions or applied from a general tolerance block or general note. For basic dimensions, geometric tolerances are indirectly applied in a related feature control frame. The only exceptions are for dimensions marked as minimum, maximum, stock or reference.
2. Dimensions and tolerancing shall fully define each feature. Measurement directly from the drawing or assuming dimensions is not allowed except for special undimensioned drawings.
3. A drawing should have the minimum number of dimensions required to fully define the end product. The use of reference dimensions should be minimized.
4. Dimensions should be applied to features and arranged to represent the function and mating relationship of the part. There should only be one way to interpret dimensions.
5. Part geometry should be defined without explicitly specifying manufacturing methods.
6. If dimensions are required during manufacturing but not the final geometry (due to shrinkage or other causes) they should be marked as non-mandatory.
7. Dimensions should be arranged for maximum readability and should be applied to visible lines in true profiles.
8. When geometry is normally controlled by gauge sizes or by code (e.g. stock materials), the dimension(s) shall be included with the gauge or code number in parentheses following the dimension.
9. Angles of 90° are assumed when lines (including center lines) are shown at right angles, but no angle is specified.
10. Basic 90° angles are assumed where center lines of features in a pattern or surfaces shown at right angles on a 2D orthographic drawing are located or defined by basic dimensions and no angle is specified.
11. A basic dimension of zero is assumed where axes, center planes, or surfaces are shown coincident on a drawing, and the relationship between features is defined by geometric tolerances.
12. Dimensions and tolerances are valid at 20 °C (68 °F) and 101.3 kPa (14.69 psi) unless stated otherwise.
13. Unless explicitly stated, dimensions and tolerances only apply in a free-state condition.
14. Unless explicitly stated, tolerances apply to the full length, width, and depth of a feature.
15. Dimensions and tolerances only apply at the level of the drawing where specified. It is not mandatory that they apply at other levels (such as an assembly drawing).
16. Coordinate systems shown on drawings should be right-handed. Each axis should be labeled and the positive direction should be shown.

== Symbols ==
=== List of geometric characteristics ===
Geometric characteristic reference chart
Application	Type of control	Characteristic	Symbol	Unicode character	Relevant feature		Virtual condition affected	References datum	Modified by		Affected by	
Application	Type of control	Characteristic	Symbol	Unicode character	Surface	Of size	Virtual condition affected	References datum	Ⓜ	Ⓢ	Bonus	Shift
Individual features	Form	Straightness		⏤ U+23E4	Yes	Yes	Of size (Note: When applied to a feature of size.)	No	Of size	No (Note: Automatically (Note: When a datum feature of size is referenced with the maximum material condition modifier.))	Ⓜ (Note: When a maximal material condition modifier is used.)	No
Individual features	Form	Flatness		⏥ U+23E5	Yes	No	No	No	No	No	No	No
Individual features	Form	Circularity		○ U+25CB	Yes	No	No	No	No	No	No	No
Individual features	Form	Cylindricity		⌭ U+232D	Yes	No	No	No	No	No	No	No
Individual or related features	Profile	Profile of a line		⌒ U+2312	Yes	No	No	Yes (Note: Can also be used as a form control without a datum reference.)	No	No	No	Datum, Ⓜ
Individual or related features	Profile	Profile of a surface		⌓ U+2313	Yes	No	No	Yes	No	No	No	Datum, Ⓜ
Related features	Orientation	Perpendicularity		⟂ U+27C2	Yes	Yes	Of size	Yes	Of size	No	Ⓜ	Datum, Ⓜ
Related features	Orientation	Angularity		∠ U+2220	Yes	Yes	Of size	Yes	Of size	No	Ⓜ	Datum, Ⓜ
Related features	Orientation	Parallelism		∥ U+2225	Yes	Yes	Of size	Yes	Of size	No	Ⓜ	Datum, Ⓜ
Related features	Location	Symmetry (Note: In the 2018 revision, both concentricity and symmetry were eliminated and are no longer supported.) (Note: The symmetry symbol's characteristics were not included in the version of the chart that this chart is derived from. The symmetry symbol was dropped from the Y14.5M standard around 1982 and re-added around 1994.)		⌯ U+232F	No	Yes	Yes	Yes	No	No	No	No
Related features	Location	Position		⌖ U+2316	No	Yes	Yes	Yes	Yes	Yes	Ⓜ	Datum, Ⓜ
Related features	Location	Concentricity		◎ U+25CE	No	Yes	Yes	Yes	No	No	No	No
Related features	Run-out	Circular run-out		↗ U+2197	Yes	Yes	Of size	Yes	No	No	No	No
Related features	Run-out	Total run-out		⌰ U+2330	Yes	Yes	Of size	Yes	No	No	No	No

=== List of modifiers ===
The following table shows only some of the more commonly used modifiers in GD&T. It is not an exhaustive list.

Symbols used in a "feature control frame" to specify a feature's description, tolerance, modifier and datum references
Symbol	Unicode character	Modifier	Definition	Notes
	Ⓕ U+24BB	Free state	"The condition of a part free of applied forces"	Applies only when part is otherwise restrained
	Ⓛ U+24C1	Least material condition (LMC)	"The condition in which a feature of size contains the least amount of material within the stated limits of size"	Useful to maintain minimum wall thickness
	Ⓜ U+24C2	Maximum material condition (MMC)	"The condition in which a feature of size contains the maximum amount of material within the stated limits of size"	Provides bonus tolerance only for a feature of size
	Ⓟ U+24C5	Projected tolerance zone		Useful on threaded holes for long studs
	Ⓢ U+24C8	Regardless of feature size (RFS)	"Indicates a geometric tolerance applies at any increment of size of the actual mating envelope of the feature of size"	Not part of the 1994 version. See para. A5, bullet 3. Also para. D3. Also, Figure 3–8.
	Ⓣ U+24C9	Tangent plane	"A plane that contacts the high points of the specified feature surface"	Useful for interfaces where form is not required
		Continuous feature	Identifies "a group of features of size where there is a requirement that they be treated geometrically as a single feature of size"	Identifies a group of features that should be "treated geometrically as a single feature"
		Statistical tolerance	Indicates that features "shall be produced with statistical process controls".	Appears in the 1994 version of the standard, assumes appropriate statistical process control.
	Ⓤ U+24CA	Unequal bilateral		Added in the 2009 version of the standard, and refers to unequal profile distribution. Number after this symbol indicates tolerance in the "plus material" direction.

== Certification ==
The American Society of Mechanical Engineers (ASME) provides two levels of certification:

- Technologist GDTP, which provides an assessment of an individual's ability to understand drawings that have been prepared using the language of Geometric Dimensioning & Tolerancing.
- Senior GDTP, which provides the additional measure of an individual's ability to select proper geometric controls as well as to properly apply them to drawings.

ISO GPS Certifications are common in Europe and Asia. They can be acquired through local norming bodies like the DIN

Other certification providers like GD&T basics, GeoTol and Excedify follow a certification model of 3 levels usually starting with print reading, GD&T essentials/fundamentals then GD&T advanced/ applied, also a specialised certification for inspection is common. Yet all certifications are based on the ASME model.

== Data exchange ==
The exchange of geometric dimensioning and tolerancing (GD&T) information between CAD systems is available on different levels of fidelity for different purposes:

- In the early days of CAD, exchange-only lines, texts and symbols were written into the exchange file. A receiving system could display them on the screen or print them out, but only a human could interpret them.
- GD&T presentation: On a next higher level the presentation information is enhanced by grouping them together into callouts for a particular purpose, e.g. a datum feature callout and a datum reference frame. And there is also the information which of the curves in the file are leader, projection or dimension curves and which are used to form the shape of a product.
- GD&T representation: Unlike GD&T presentation, the GD&T representation does not deal with how the information is presented to the user but only deals with which element of a shape of a product has which GD&T characteristic. A system supporting GD&T representation may display GD&T information in some tree and other dialogs and allow the user to directly select and highlight the corresponding feature on the shape of the product, 2D and 3D.
- Ideally both GD&T presentation and representation are available in the exchange file and are associated with each other. Then a receiving system can allow a user to select a GD&T callout and get the corresponding feature highlighted on the shape of the product.
- An enhancement of GD&T representation is defining a formal language for GD&T (similar to a programming language) which also has built-in rules and restrictions for the proper GD&T usage. This is still a research area (see below reference to McCaleb and ISO 10303-1666).
- GD&T validation: Based on GD&T representation data (but not on GD&T presentation) and the shape of a product in some useful format (e.g. a boundary representation), it is possible to validate the completeness and consistency of the GD&T information. The software tool FBTol from the Kansas City Plant is probably the first one in this area.
- GD&T representation information can also be used for the software assisted manufacturing planning and cost calculation of parts. See ISO 10303-224 and 238 below.

== Documents and standards ==
=== ISO TC 10 Technical product documentation ===
- ISO 129 Technical drawings – Indication of dimensions and tolerances
- ISO 7083 Symbols for geometrical tolerancing – Proportions and dimensions
- ISO 13715 Technical drawings – Edges of undefined shape – Vocabulary and indications
- ISO 15786 Simplified representation and dimensioning of holes
- ISO 16792:2021 Technical product documentation—Digital product definition data practices (Note: ISO 16792:2006 was derived from ASME Y14.41-2003 by permission of ASME)

=== ISO/TC 213 Dimensional and geometrical product specifications and verification ===
In ISO/TR 14638 GPS – Masterplan the distinction between fundamental, global, general and complementary GPS standards is made.

- Fundamental GPS standards
  - ISO 8015 Concepts, principles and rules
- Global GPS standards
  - ISO 14660-1 Geometrical features
  - ISO/TS 17, orientation and location
  - ISO 1101 Geometrical tolerancing – Tolerances of form, orientation, location and run-out
    - Amendment 1 Representation of specifications in the form of a 3D model
  - ISO 1119 Series of conical tapers and taper angles
  - ISO 2692 Geometrical tolerancing – Maximum material requirement (MMR), least material requirement (LMR) and reciprocity requirement (RPR)
  - ISO 3040 Dimensioning and tolerancing – Cones
  - ISO 5458 Geometrical tolerancing – Positional tolerancing
  - ISO 5459 Geometrical tolerancing – Datums and datum systems
  - ISO 10578 Tolerancing of orientation and location – Projected tolerance zone
  - ISO 10579 Dimensioning and tolerancing – Non-rigid parts
  - ISO 14406 Extraction
  - ISO 22432 Features used in specification and verification
- General GPS standards: Areal and profile surface texture
  - ISO 1302 Indication of surface texture in technical product documentation
  - ISO 3274 Surface texture: Profile method – Nominal characteristics of contact (stylus) instruments
  - ISO 4287 Surface texture: Profile method – Terms, definitions and surface texture parameters
  - ISO 4288 Surface texture: Profile method – Rules and procedures for the assessment of surface texture
  - ISO 8785 Surface imperfections – Terms, definitions and parameters
  - Form of a surface independent of a datum or datum system. Each of them has a part 1 for the Vocabulary and parameters and a part 2 for the Specification operators:
    - ISO 12180 Cylindricity
    - ISO 12181 Roundness
    - ISO 12780 Straightness
    - ISO 12781 Flatness
  - ISO 25178 Surface texture: Areal
- General GPS standards: Extraction and filtration techniques
  - ISO/TS 1661 Filtration
  - ISO 11562 Surface texture: Profile method – Metrological characteristics of phase correct filters
  - ISO 12085 Surface texture: Profile method – Motif parameters
  - ISO 13565 Profile method; Surfaces having stratified functional properties

=== ASME standards ===
- ASME Y14.41 Digital Product Definition Data Practices
- ASME Y14.5 Dimensioning and Tolerancing
- ASME Y14.5.1M Mathematical Definition of Dimensioning and Tolerancing Principles

ASME is also working on a Spanish translation for the ASME Y14.5 – Dimensioning and Tolerancing Standard.

=== GD&T standards for data exchange and integration ===
- ISO 10303 Industrial automation systems and integration – Product data representation and exchange
  - ISO 10303-47 Integrated generic resource: Shape variation tolerances
  - ISO/TS 10303-1130 Application module: Derived shape element
  - ISO/TS 10303-1050 Application module: Dimension tolerance
  - ISO/TS 10303-1051 Application module: Geometric tolerance
  - ISO/TS 10303-1052 Application module: Default tolerance
  - ISO/TS 10303-1666 Application module: Extended geometric tolerance
  - ISO 10303-203 Application protocol: Configuration controlled 3D design of mechanical parts and assemblies
  - ISO 10303-210 Application protocol: Electronic assembly, interconnection, and packaging design
  - ISO 10303-214 Application protocol: Core data for automotive mechanical design processes
  - ISO 10303-224 Application protocol: Mechanical product definition for process planning using machining features
  - ISO 10303-238 Application protocol: Application interpreted model for computerized numerical controllers (STEP-NC)
  - ISO 10303-242 Application protocol: Managed model based 3D engineering

== See also ==
- Dimensional instruments
- Engineering fit
- Engineering tolerance
- Gauge (instrument)
- Geometrical Product Specification and Verification
- Position sensor
- Specification of surface finish
