= Projected tolerance zone =

Projected tolerance zone symbol (used in a feature control frame)

In geometric dimensioning and tolerancing, a projected tolerance zone is defined to predict the final dimensions and locations of features on a component or assembly subject to tolerance stack-up.
