= Tire balance =

Mass distribution in an automobile tire

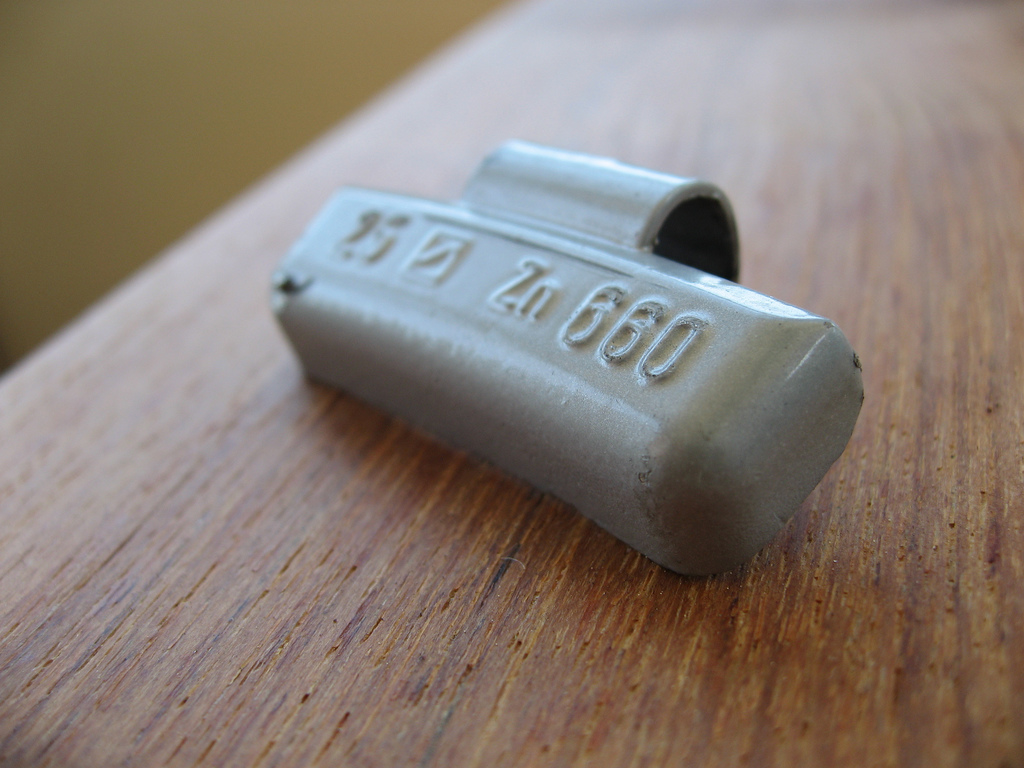
25 g zinc tire weight

Tire balance, also called tire unbalance or tire imbalance, describes the distribution of mass within an automobile tire or the entire wheel (including the rim) on which it is mounted.

When the wheel rotates, asymmetries in its mass distribution may cause it to apply periodic forces and torques to the axle, which can cause ride disturbances, usually as vertical and lateral vibrations, and this may also cause the steering wheel to oscillate. The frequency and magnitude of this ride disturbance usually increases with speed, and vehicle suspensions may become excited when the rotating frequency of the wheel equals the resonant frequency of the suspension.

Tire balance is measured in factories and repair shops by two methods: with static balancers and with dynamic balancers. Tires with large unbalances are downgraded or rejected. When tires are fitted to wheels at the point of sale, they are measured again on a balancing machine, and correction weights are applied to counteract their combined unbalance. Tires may be rebalanced if driver perceives excessive vibration. Tire balancing is distinct from wheel alignment.

== Static balance ==
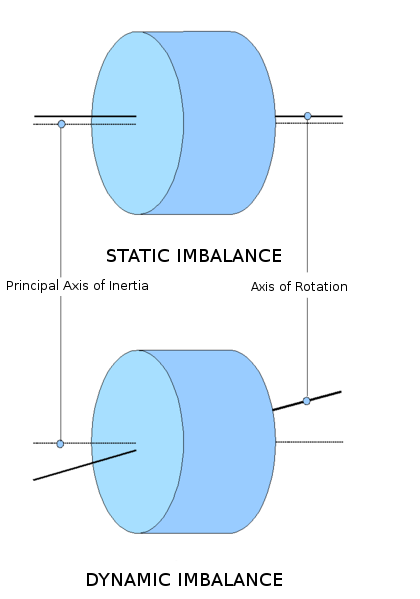
Static and dynamic imbalance is concerned with unbalanced distribution of mass (see also radial run-out and axial run-out, respectively, for concerns of variance in the position of the surface from the axis of rotation)

Static balance requires the wheel center of mass to be located on its axis of rotation, usually at the center of the axle on which it is mounted. This has some similarities to radial run-out, but involves where the center of mass is located, unlike radial run-out which involves the variance in the distance to the outer surface from the axis of rotation. Static balance can be measured by a static balancing machine where the tire is placed on a vertical, non-rotating spindle. If the center of mass of the tire is not located on this vertical axis, then gravity will cause the axis to deflect. The amount of deflection indicates the magnitude of the unbalance, and the orientation of the deflection indicates the angular location of the unbalance. In tire manufacturing factories, static balancers use sensors mounted to the spindle assembly. In tire retail shops, static balancers are usually non-rotating bubble balancers, where the magnitude and angle of the unbalance is indicated by the center bubble in an oil-filled glass sighting gauge. While some very small shops that lack specialized machines still do this process, they have been largely replaced in larger shops with machines.

== Dynamic balance ==
Dynamic balance requires that a principal axis of the tire's moment of inertia be aligned with the axis about which the tire rotates, usually the axle on which it is mounted. This is similar to axial run-out, but again, dynamic balance involves where the center of mass is, while axial runout involves the distance of the outer surface from the axis of rotation. In the tire factory, the tire and wheel are mounted on a balancing machine test wheel, the assembly is rotated at 100 r/min (about 5–7 m/s (18–25 km/h; 11–16 mph) with recent high sensitivity sensors) or higher, 300 r/min (about 25–27 m/s (90–97 km/h; 56–60 mph) with typical low sensitivity sensors), and forces of unbalance are measured by sensors. These forces are resolved into static and couple values for the inner and outer planes of the wheel, and compared to the unbalance tolerance (the maximum allowable manufacturing limits). If the tire is not checked, it has the potential to cause vibration in the suspension of the vehicle on which it is mounted. In tire retail shops, tire/wheel assemblies are checked on a spin-balancer, which determines the amount and angle of unbalance. Balance weights are then fitted to the outer and inner flanges of the wheel.

Although dynamic balance is theoretically better than static balance, because both dynamic and static imbalances can be measured and corrected, its effectiveness is disputed because of the flexible nature of the rubber. A tire in a free spinning machine may not experience the same centrifugal distortion, heat distortion, nor weight and camber that it would on a vehicle. Dynamic balancing may therefore create new unintended imbalances.

Dynamic balancing has traditionally required removing the wheel from the vehicle, but sensors installed in modern cars, such as for anti-lock brakes, could enable estimating the imbalance while driving.

== Vehicle vibration ==
Vibration in automobiles may occur for many reasons, such as wheel unbalance, imperfect tire or wheel shape, brake pulsation, and worn or loose driveline, suspension, or steering components. Unbalance can result from collision-induced wheel deformations, uneven tire wear, or a shift of the tire on the rim. In some cases, losing a counterweight or bumping the curb hard can lead to wheel unbalance. Foreign material, such as road tar, stones, ice, or snow, that is stuck in a tire's tread or otherwise adhered to the tire or wheel may also cause a temporary unbalance and subsequent vibration. Uneven weight distribution in the wheel and tire assembly can result from manufacturing inaccuracies, uneven tread wear, damage over time, or improper tire mounting.

== Environmental consequences ==
As balancing weights are attached to the exterior of the wheel, they may break or fall off while driving. Traditionally, these weights have been made of lead; it is estimated that up to 230 tonnes (500,000 lb) of lead, having fallen off car wheels, ended up in the environment. According to the United States Environmental Protection Agency, these total more than 20,000 tonnes of lead worldwide every year, and therefore the use of less-toxic materials is encouraged. In Europe, lead weights have been banned since 2005; in the United States, they have been banned by various states but have not been restricted at the federal level. Alternatives include weights made of zinc-lead or leaded copper, or weights that are altogether lead-free.

== See also ==
- Speed wobble
- Rotordynamics
- Run-out, an inaccuracy of rotating mechanical systems
