= Steering damper =

Device that helps dampen steering from side to side

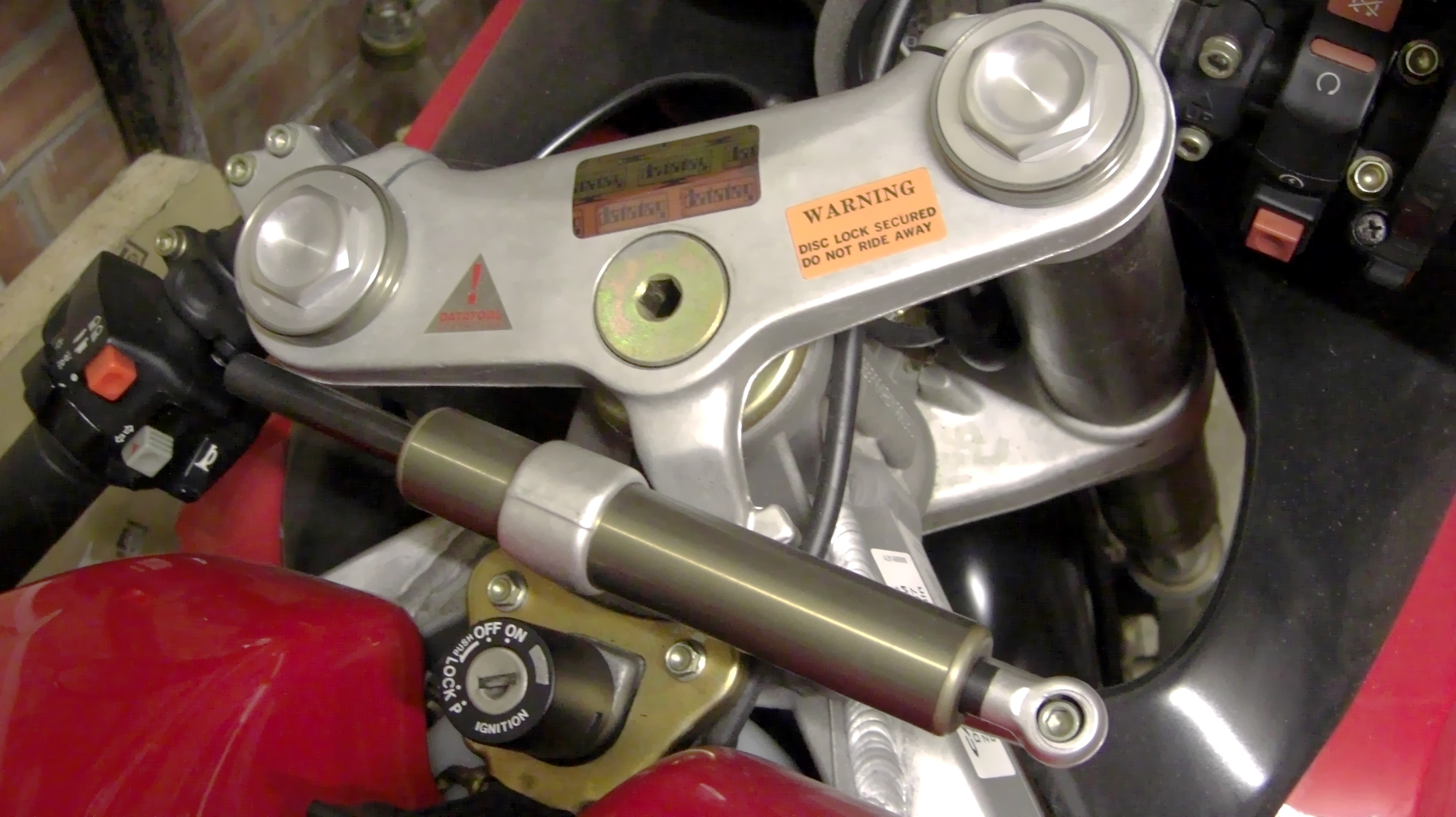
Transverse linear motorcycle steering damper (centre foreground)

A steering damper or steering stabiliser is a damping device designed to inhibit speed wobble which is an undesirable, uncontrolled movement or oscillation of a vehicle steering mechanism, a phenomenon known in motorcycling also known as the death wobble. The stabilizer absorbs unwanted energy in the side to side motion allowing the forks and shocks to work properly. Many things can cause a motorcycle chassis to get upset such as slamming on brakes, rough road, and lastly improper setup. An upset chassis can be a great deal of danger for the rider oftentimes resulting in a crash. A steering stabilizer slows those movements down resulting in the rider feeling more comfortable on the motorcycle.

== On motorcycles ==
Sport bikes have a short wheelbase and an aggressive steering geometry to provide the ability to make very quick changes in direction. This has the harmful side-effect of making the bike less stable, more prone to feedback from uneven road surfaces, and more difficult to control. If the front wheel significantly deviates from the direction of travel when it touches down, it may cause an unwanted wobble. Steering dampers are factory installed on most sport motorcycles as well as contemporary racing bikes to counter these behaviors. Steering dampers are also mounted to off-road motorcycles such as motocross and off-road bikes. A damper helps keep the bike tracking straight over difficult terrain such as ruts, rocks, and sand, and also smooths out jolts through the handlebars at the end of jumps. They also reduce arm fatigue by reducing the effort to control the handlebars. While they do help with less fatigue they will not completely take it away.

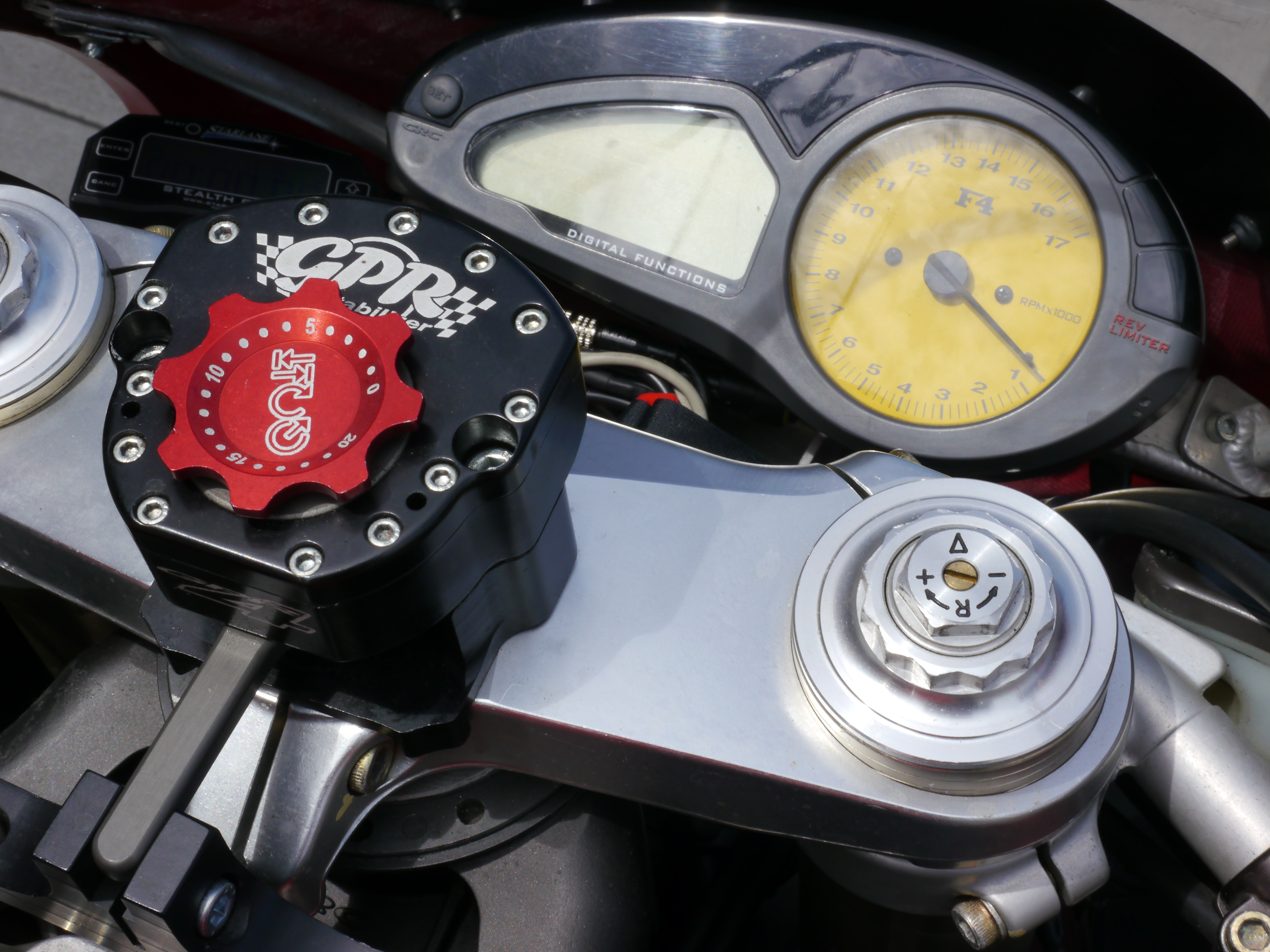
Rotary motorcycle steering damper (centre left)

On motorcycles, one end of the damper is mounted to the steering yoke or triple tree, the other to the frame. Three main types are linear, electronic and radial. Linear dampers resemble a telescoping shock absorber and operate in a similar manner. They can be aligned either longitudinally and to one side of the steering, or transversely across the bike. Radial dampers resemble small boxes and operate via a rotating pivot. They are mounted coaxially with the steering axis and are typically located on top of the triple tree (top of fork leg). An electronically variable damper uses a radial damper with hydraulic fluid that flows freely at low speeds, allowing easy turning, while restricting flow at higher speeds when more damping is necessary, as determined by the ECM (Electronic Control Module). A prime example of this is HPSD (Honda Progressive Steering Damper).

For motorcycles with sidecars, especially for motorcycles which have been retrofitted with a sidecar and where the front wheel geometry, or trail, has not been adjusted for use with a sidecar, a steering damper is beneficial. This prevents low speed wobble which may occur in the lower speed range of about 13 to 20 mph (21 to 32 km/h). In older motorcycles adjustable friction dampers had been routinely installed. Hydraulically operated steering dampers may be retrofitted. In some jurisdictions, the installation and operation of a steering damper must be inspected by an expert or examiner and must be entered in the vehicle papers.

== On bicycles ==
Steering dampers have been available for bicycles as well. There is also a mechanism by the same name that consists only of a spring connected to the frame and the fork that merely provides a progressive torque to straighten the steering.

== Gallery ==
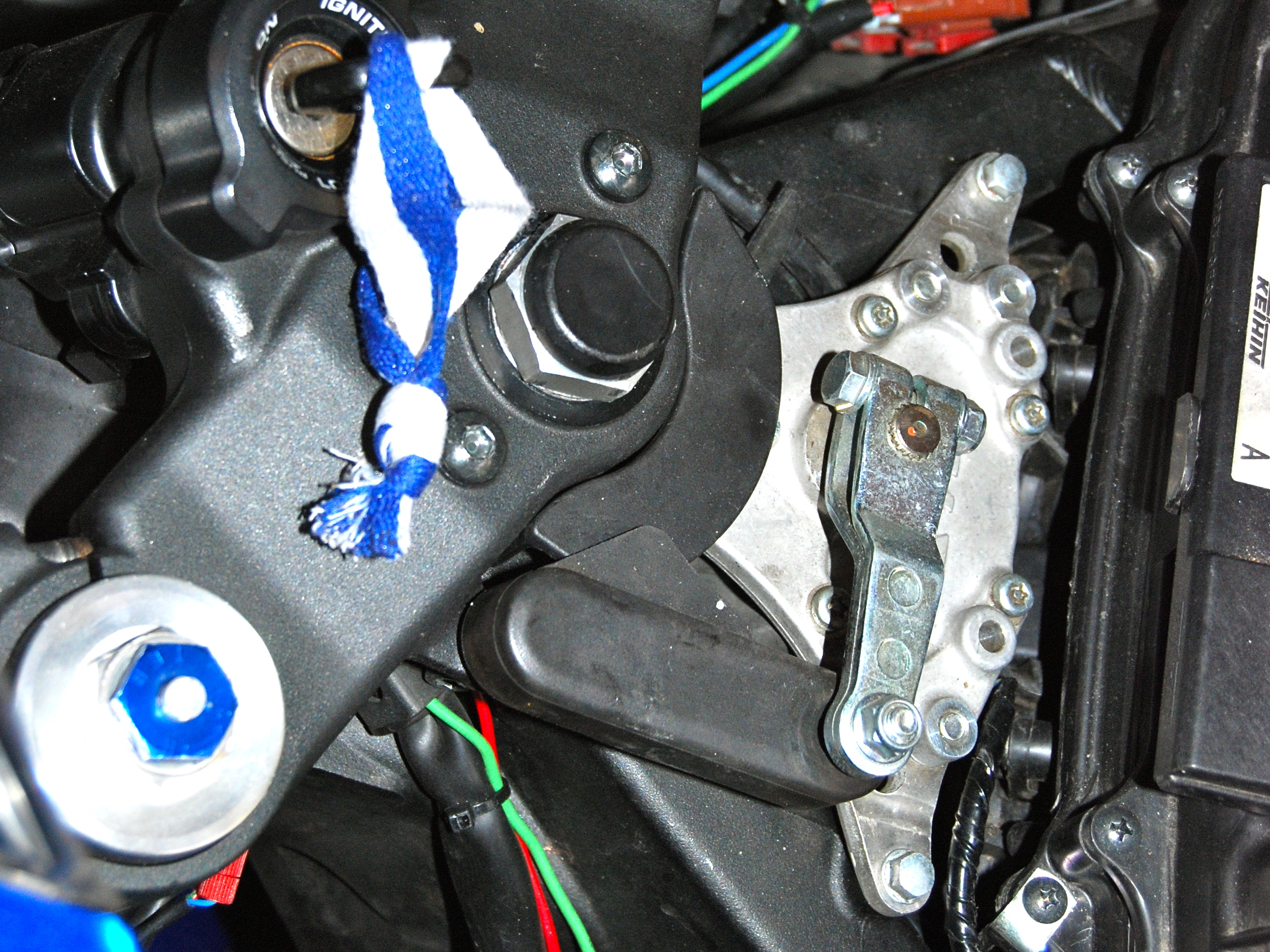
Electronic steering damper with control arm attached to the upper triple clamp

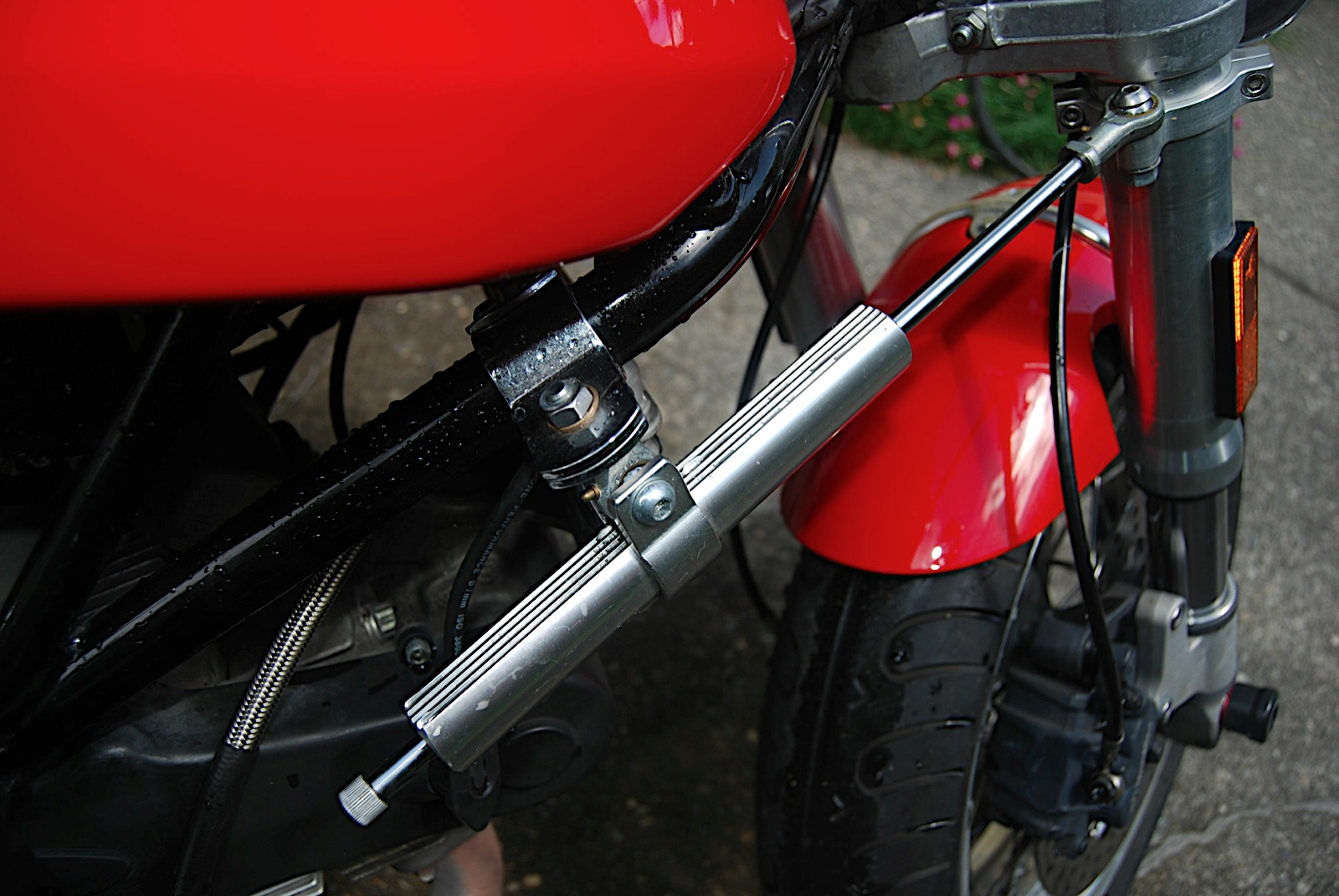
An aftermarket longitudinal linear motorcycle steering damper attached below the lower triple clamp

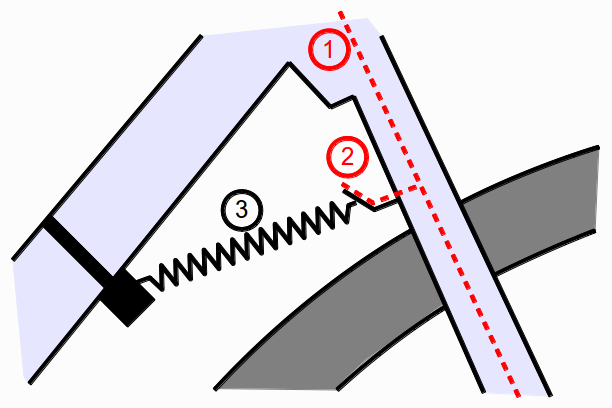
Schematic of a simple spring "steering damper" for bicycle

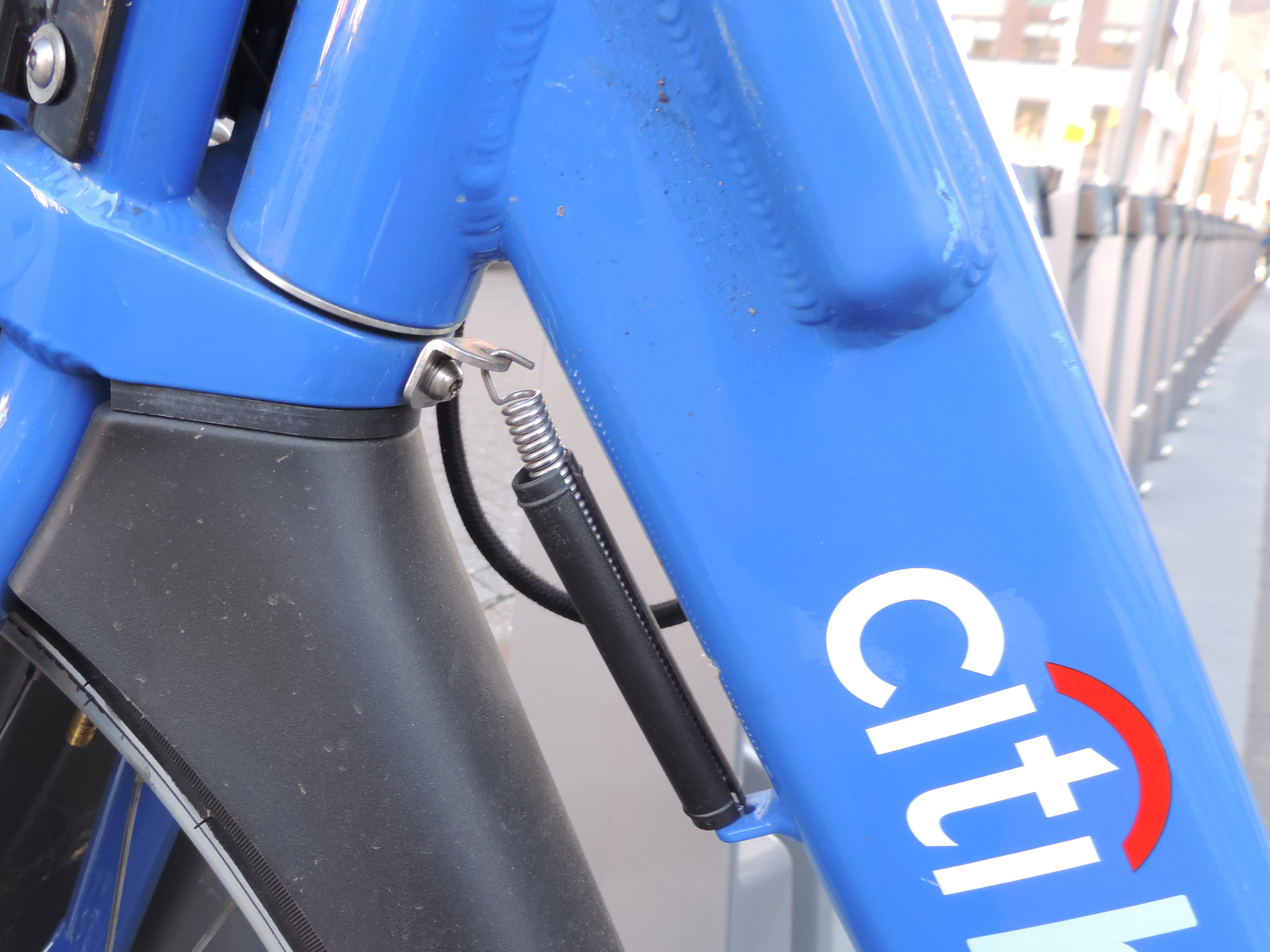
Steering spring photo
