= Position tolerance =

Engineering symbol

Position tolerance (symbol: ⌖) is a geometric dimensioning and tolerancing (GD&T) location control used on engineering drawings to specify desired location, as well as allowed deviation to the position of a feature on a part.

Position tolerance must only be applied to features of size, which requires that the feature have at least two opposable points.

== See also ==
- Circle
- Miscellaneous Technical, a Unicode block containing various common technical and academic symbols
