= Run-out =

Mechanical deviation from the intended axis

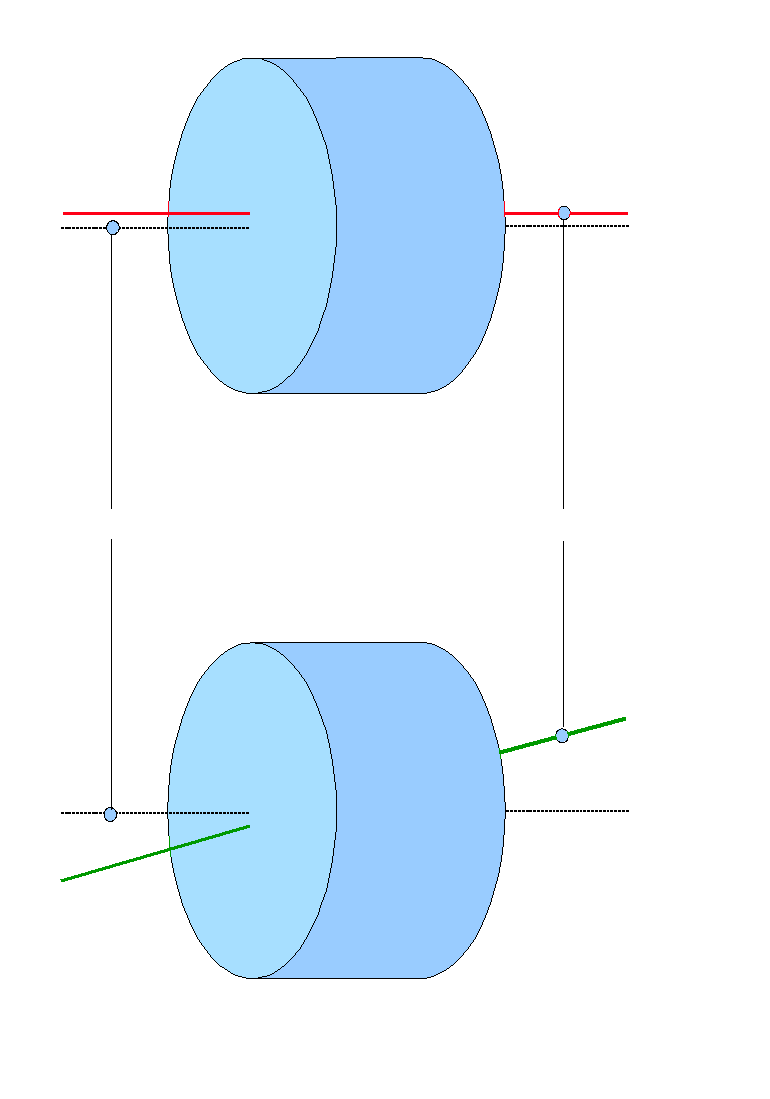

Technical symbol for run-out

Run-out or runout is an inaccuracy of rotating mechanical systems, specifically that the tool or shaft does not rotate exactly in line with the main axis. For example; when drilling, run-out will result in a larger hole than the drill's nominal diameter due to the drill being rotated eccentrically (off axis instead of in line). In the case of bearings, run-out will cause vibration of the machine and increased loads on the bearings.

Run-out is dynamic and cannot be compensated. If a rotating component, such as a drill chuck, does not hold the drill centrally, then as it rotates the rotating drill will turn about a secondary axis.

Absolute alignment is impossible; a degree of error will always be present.

== Types ==
Run-out has two main forms:

- Radial run-out is caused by the tool being translated off the machine axis, still parallel. Radial run-out will measure the same all along the machine axis.
- Axial run-out is caused by the tool or component being at an angle to the axis. Axial run-out causes the tip of the tool or shaft to rotate off-centre relative to the base. Axial run-out will vary according to how far from the base it is measured.

In addition, irregular run-out is the result of worn or rough bearings which can manifest itself as either axial or radial run-out.

Run-out will be present in any rotating system and, depending on the system, the different forms may either combine increasing total runout, or cancel reducing total runout. At any point along a tool or shaft, it is not possible to determine whether runout is axial or radial; only by measuring along the axis can they be differentiated.

=== Radial run-out ===
Radial run-out is the result of a rotating component running off centre, such as a ball bearing with an offset centre. This means that the rotating tool or shaft, instead of being centrally aligned, will rotate about a secondary axis. In general, cutting tools are more tolerant of radial run-out since the edges are parallel to the line of cutting tending to keep the tool tip aligned. However, a rotating shaft may be less tolerant of radial run-out since the centre of gravity is displaced by the amount of run-out.

=== Axial run-out ===
Axial run-out is the result of a rotating component not being parallel with the axis, such as a drill chuck not holding the drill exactly in line with the axis. In general, cutting tools are less tolerant of axial run-out since the tool tip tends to dig in and further increase run-out. However, a shaft may be more tolerant of axial run-out since the centre of gravity is displaced less.

== Measurement ==
Typically run-out is measured using a dial indicator pressed against the rotating component while it is turned. Full indicator movement (previously called total indicator reading or total indicated run-out, TIR) is a term for the measured run-out of any rotating system, including all forms of run-out, at the measured point.

== See also ==
- Chaotic rotation
- Geometric dimensioning and tolerancing
- Nutation
- Tire balance, related concept in vehicles
