= Sine bar =

Measuring instrument in metalworking

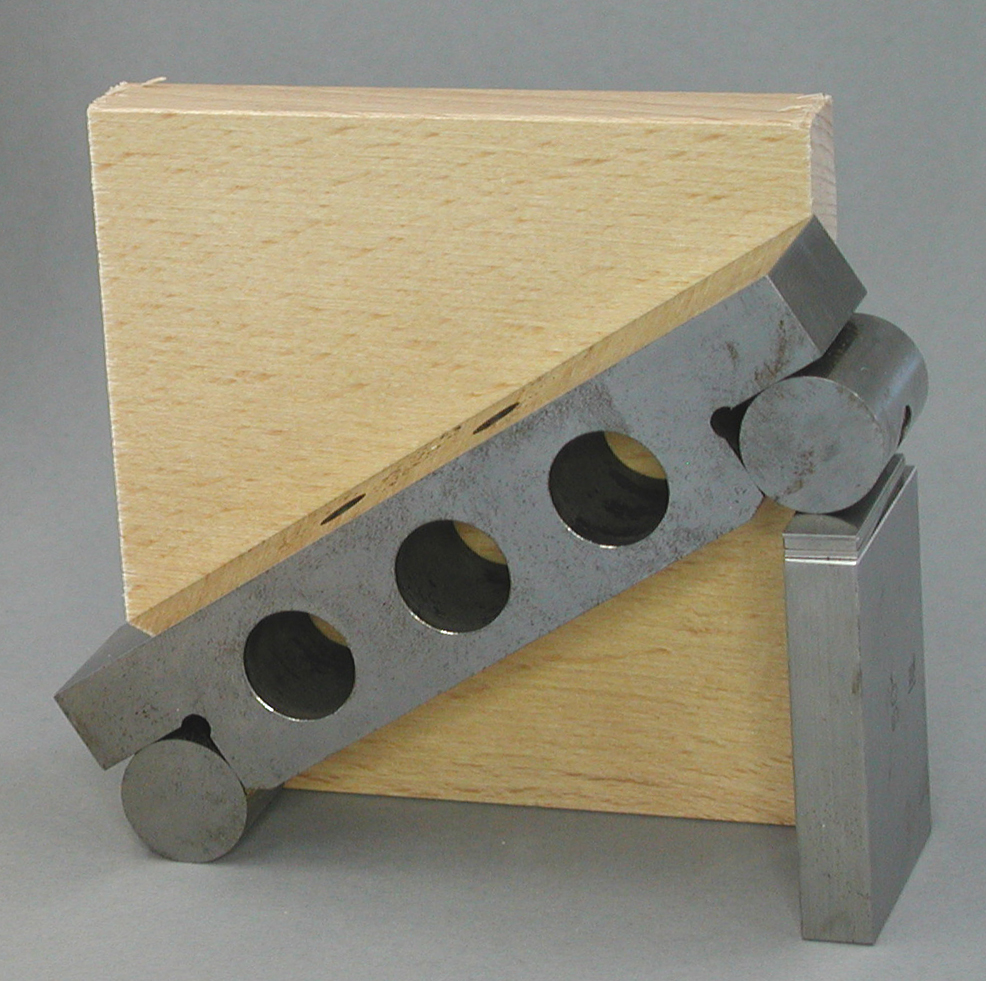
Sine bar set up with one end raised on a stack of gauge blocks

Trigonometric triangle with sides. The opposite side is perpendicular relative to AC axis.

A sine bar consists of a hardened, precision ground body with two precision ground cylinders fixed at the ends. The distance between the centers of the cylinders is precisely controlled, and the top of the bar is parallel to a line through the centers of the two rollers. The dimension between the two rollers is chosen to be a whole number (for ease of later calculations) and forms the hypotenuse of a triangle when in use.

When a sine bar is placed on a level surface the top edge will be parallel to that surface. If one roller is raised by a known distance, usually using gauge blocks, then the top edge of the bar will be tilted by the same amount forming an angle that may be calculated by the application of the sine rule.

- The hypotenuse is a constant dimension—(100 mm or 10 inches in the examples shown).
- The height is obtained from the dimension between the bottom of one roller and the table's surface.
- The angle is calculated by using the sine rule (a trigonometric function from mathematics). Some engineering and metalworking reference books contain tables showing the dimension required to obtain an angle from 0-90 degrees, incremented by 1 minute intervals.

$$\sin \left(angle \right) = {perpendicular \over hypotenuse}$$

Angles may be measured or set with this tool.

== Principle ==
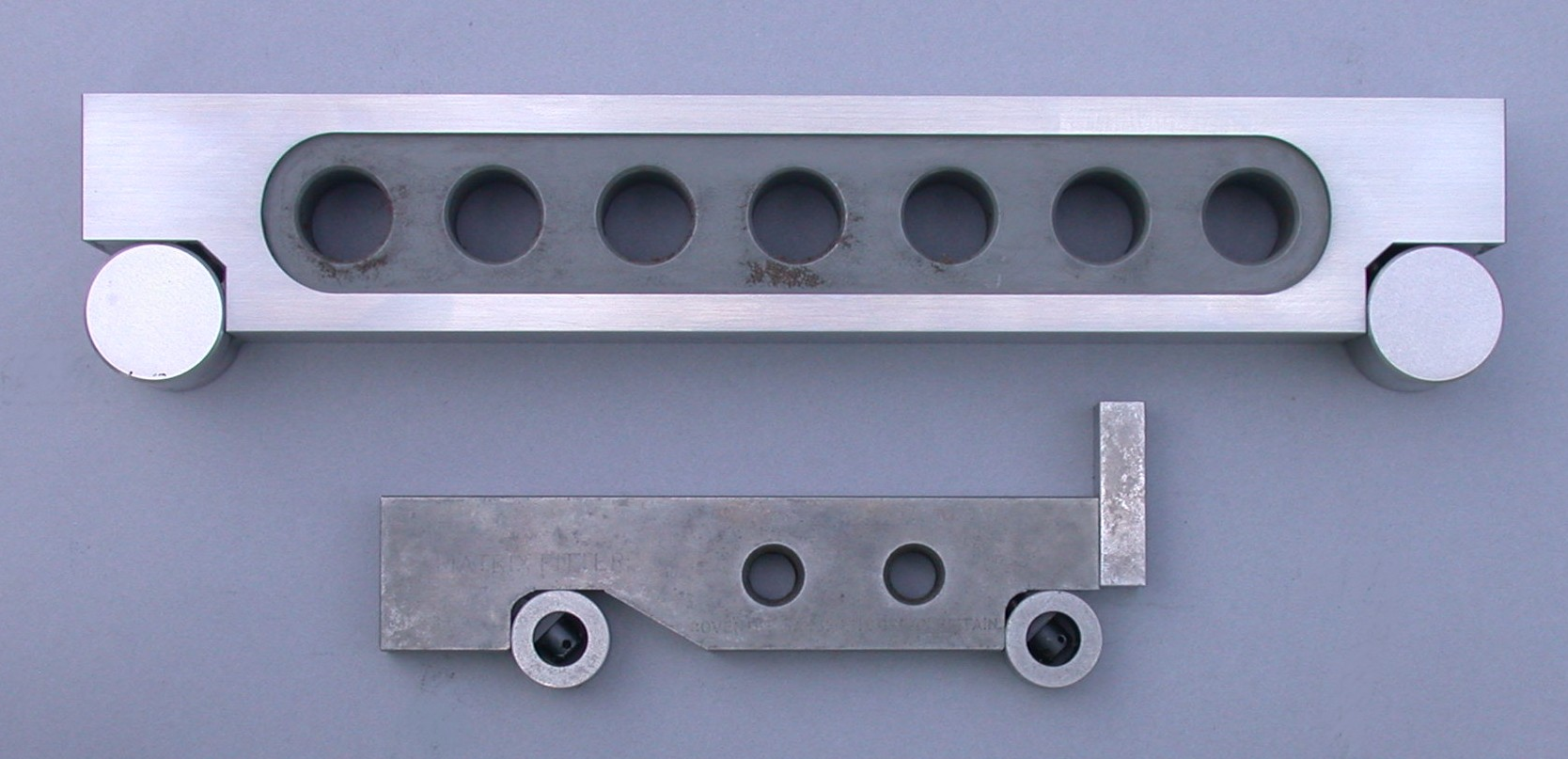
254 mm (10") and 100 (3.93") sine bars. In the U.S., 127 mm (5") sine bars are the most common size.

Angles are measured using a sine bar with the help of gauge blocks and a dial gauge or a spirit level. The aim of a measurement is to measure the surface on which the dial gauge or spirit level is placed horizontally. For example, to measure the angle of a wedge, the wedge is placed on a horizontal table. The sine bar is placed over the inclined surface of the wedge. At this position, the top surface of the sine bar is inclined the same amount as the wedge. Using gauge blocks, the top surface is made horizontal. The sine of the angle of inclination of the wedge is the ratio of the height of the gauge blocks used and the distance between the centers of the cylinders.

== Types ==
The simplest type consists of a lapped steel bar, at each end of which is attached an accurate cylinder, the axes of the cylinders being mutually parallel and parallel to the upper surface of the bar. In the advanced type some holes are drilled in the body of the bar to reduce the weight and facilitate handling.

=== Sine centre ===
A special type of sine bar is sine center which is used for conical objects having male and female parts. It cannot measure the angle more than 60 degrees.

=== Sine table ===
A sine table (or sine plate) is a large and wide sine bar, typically equipped with a mechanism for locking it in place after positioning, which is used to hold workpieces during operations.

=== Compound sine table ===
It is used to measure compound angles of large workpiece. In this case, two sine tables are mounted one over the other at right angles. The tables can be twisted to get the required alignment.
