= Carl Edvard Johansson =

Swedish inventor and scientist (1864–1943)

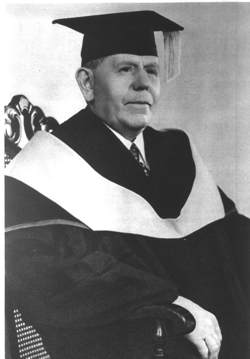
- Born: 15 March 1864; Frötuna bruk, Sweden
- Died: 30 September 1943 (aged 79); Eskilstuna, Sweden

Carl Edvard Johansson (15 March 1864 – 30 September 1943) was a Swedish inventor and scientist.

Johansson was born at Frötuna bruk, Fellingsbro, Örebro County.

Johansson invented the gauge block set, also known as "Jo Blocks" ("Johansson gauge blocks"). He was granted his first Swedish patent on 2 May 1901, Swedish patent No. 17017 called "Gauge Block Sets for Precision Measurement". He formed the Swedish company CE Johansson AB (CEJ AB), Eskilstuna, Sweden in 1911. The first CEJ gauge block set in America was sold to Henry M. Leland at Cadillac Automobile Co. around 1908.

There are only two people I take off my hat to. One is the president of the United States and the other is Mr. Johansson from Sweden.

— Henry M. Leland, around 1920.

At the end of his career, in 1923, Johansson started to work for Henry Ford at the Ford Motor Company, in Dearborn, Michigan. Ford bought the entire American company, CE Johansson Inc., that he had established 1918 in Poughkeepsie, New York and all the equipment was moved to Dearborn. Some of his Swedish employees that worked in Poughkeepsie were also employed by Ford. At the age of 72, he decided to retire and went back to Sweden. During his life he had crossed the Atlantic Ocean 22 times and spent a lot of time in America.

He received a number of awards and honors, including the large gold medal of the Royal Swedish Academy of Engineering Sciences, posthumously in 1943, shortly after his death in Eskilstuna.

== Johansson and the inch ==
In the 1910s, the U.S. and U.K. definitions of the inch differed, with the U.S. inch being defined as 25.4000508 mm (with a reference temperature of 68 °F (20 °C)) and the U.K. inch at 25.399977 mm (with a reference temperature of 62 °F (17 °C)).

When he started manufacturing gauge blocks in inch sizes in 1912, Johansson's compromise was to manufacture gauge blocks with a nominal size of 25.4 mm (with a reference temperature of 20 degrees Celsius or 68 degrees Fahrenheit), accurate to within a few parts per million of both official definitions. Because Johansson's blocks were so popular, his blocks became the de facto standard for manufacturers in both countries, leading industry associations to adopt 25.4 mm as the standard "industrial inch" in the U.K. in 1930 and the U.S. in 1933.

When the English-speaking nations jointly signed the International Yard and Pound Agreement of 1959, the inch was fixed at 25.4 mm worldwide, effectively endorsing what had already become common practice.

== Life and family ==
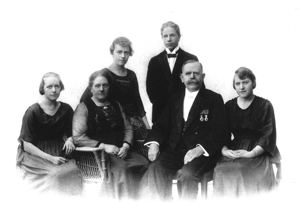
Carl Edvard, his wife Margareta and their four children, from left; Elsa, Signe, Edvard and Gertrud. Photo around 1930.

Johansson was married to Margareta Andersson in 1896. They had four children: Elsa, Signe, Edvard, and Gertrud.

== Bibliography ==
- Althin, Torsten K.W. (1948), C.E. Johansson, 1864–1943: The Master of Measurement, Stockholm: Ab. C.E. Johansson [C.E. Johansson corporation], LCCN 74219452.
- SE 17017, Johansson, C. E., "Mattsats för precisionsmattagning", published 2 May 1901, issued 30 January 1904
