= Window (optics) =

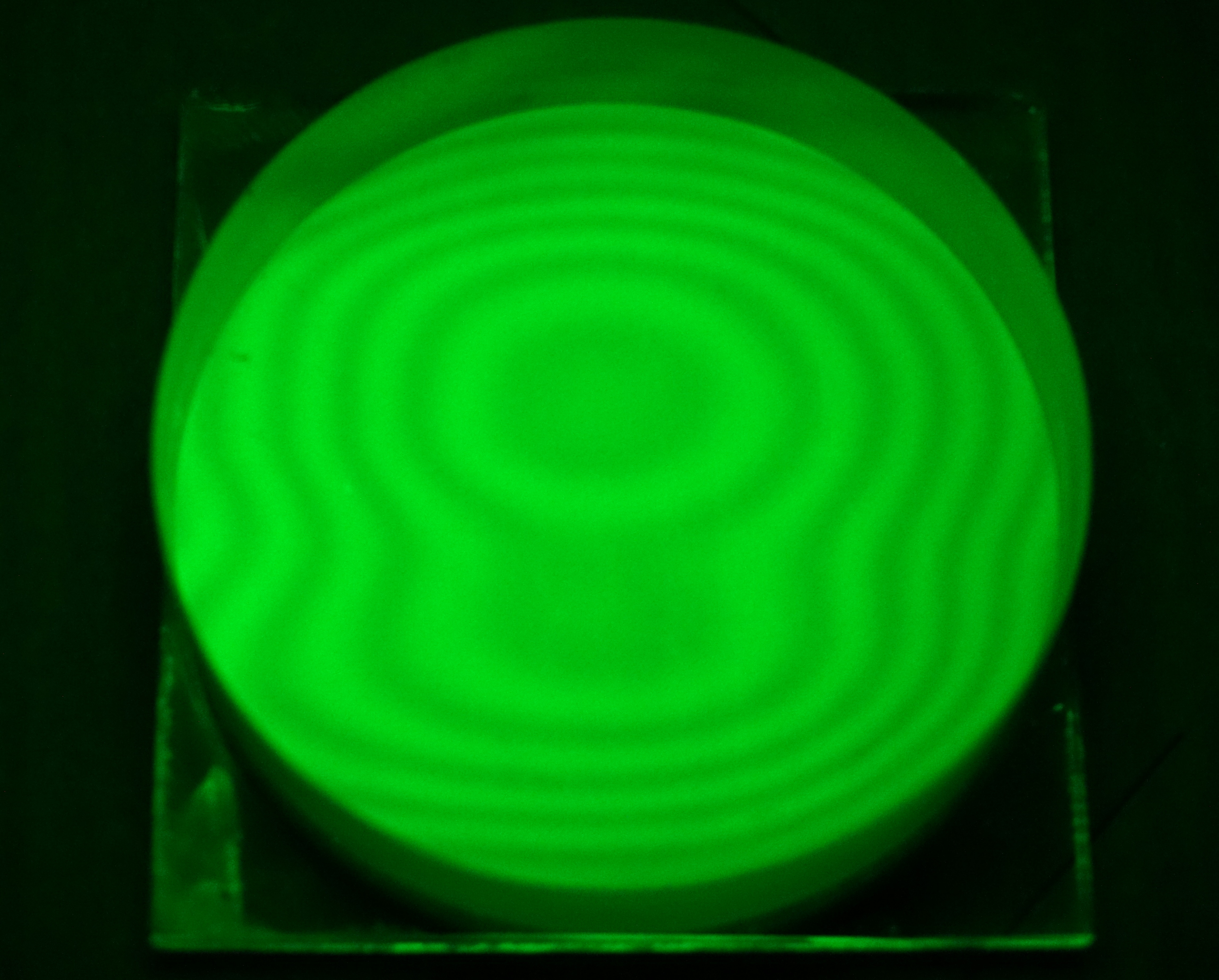
A flatness test of a float-glass optical window on top of a λ/10 optical flat. The window measures a flatness of 4–6 λ per inch.

In optics, a window is an optical element that is transparent to a range of wavelengths, and that has no optical power. Windows may be flat or curved. They are used to block the flow of air or other fluids while allowing light to pass into or out of an optical system.

== General characteristics ==
In general, an optical window is a material that allows light into an optical instrument. The material has to be transparent to a wavelength range of interest but not necessarily to visible light. Usually, it is mechanically flat and sometimes it also is optically flat, depending on resolution requirements. A window of this sort is commonly parallel and is likely to be anti-reflection coated, especially if it is designed for visible light. An optical window may be built into a piece of equipment (such as a vacuum chamber) to allow optical instruments to view inside that equipment.

== In spectroscopy ==
Optical windows used for UV/VIS spectroscopy, are usually made from glass or fused silica. In IR spectroscopy, there is a wide range of materials that transmit light into the far infrared and can be utilized for the construction of optical windows, from barium fluoride (BaF_{2}), calcium fluoride, potassium bromide, potassium chloride, sodium chloride, germanium (Ge), zinc selenide (ZnSe) and sapphire. These windows are either built into circular, elliptical or rectangular configurations.
