= Newton's rings =

Optical interference pattern of concentric rings

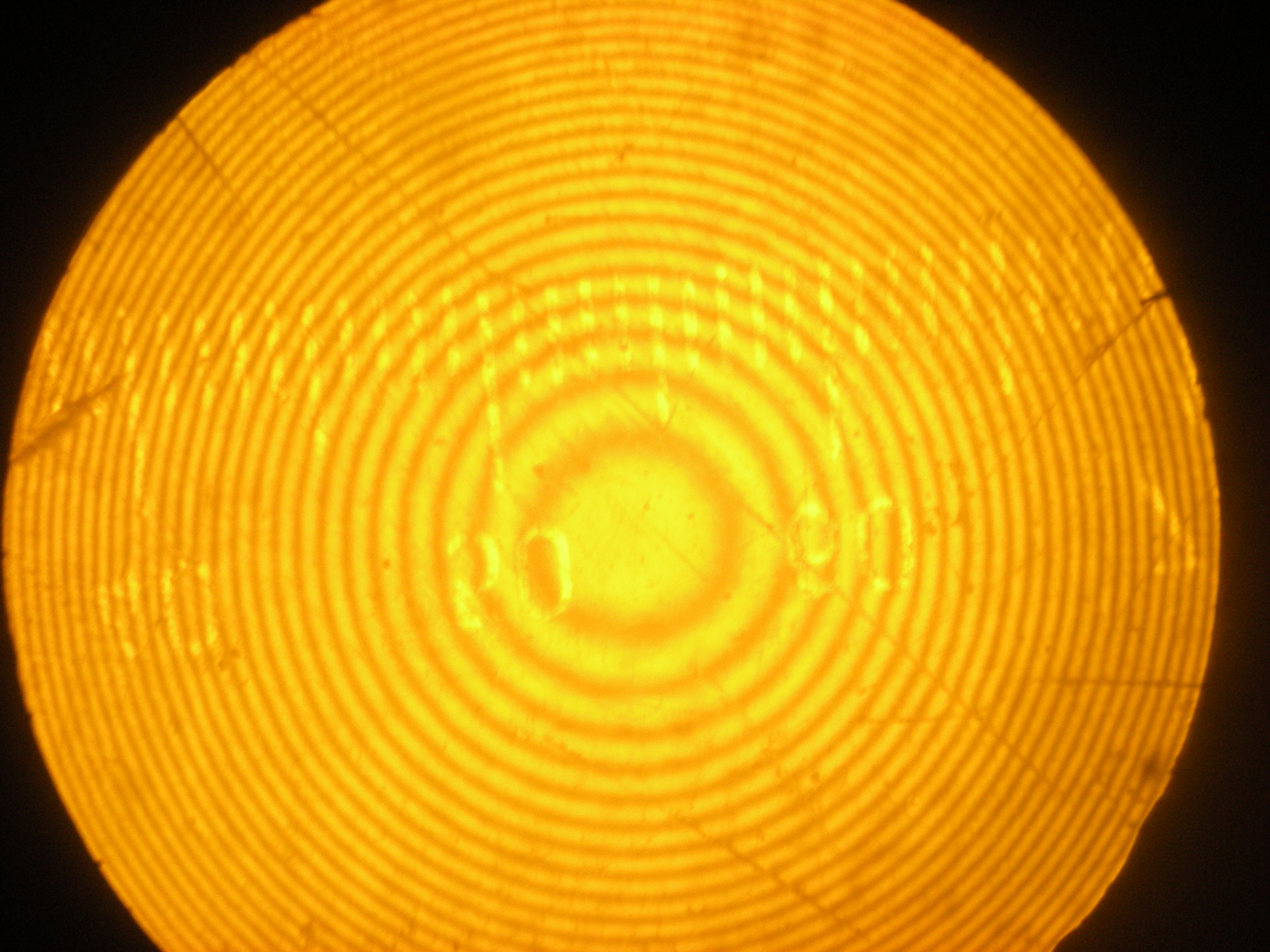
Newton's rings observed through a microscope. The smallest increments on the superimposed scale are 100 μm. The illumination is from below, leading to a bright central region.

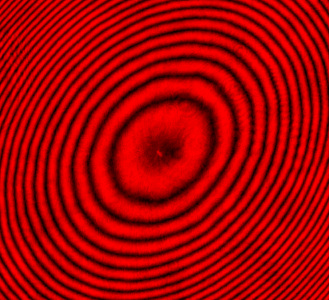
Newton's rings interference pattern created by a plano-convex lens illuminated by 650 nm red laser light, photographed using a low-light microscope. The illumination is from above, leading to a dark central region.

Newton's rings is a phenomenon in which an interference pattern is created by the reflection of light between two surfaces, typically a spherical surface and an adjacent touching flat surface. It is named after Isaac Newton, who investigated the effect in 1666. When viewed with monochromatic light, Newton's rings appear as a series of concentric, alternating bright and dark rings centered at the point of contact between the two surfaces. When viewed with white light, it forms a concentric ring pattern of rainbow colors because the different wavelengths of light interfere at different thicknesses of the air layer between the surfaces.

== History ==
The phenomenon was first described by Robert Hooke in his 1665 book Micrographia. Its name derives from the mathematician and physicist Sir Isaac Newton, who studied the phenomenon in 1666 while sequestered at home in Lincolnshire in the time of the Great Plague that had shut down Trinity College, Cambridge. He recorded his observations in an essay entitled "Of Colours". The phenomenon became a source of dispute between Newton, who favored a corpuscular nature of light, and Hooke, who favored a wave-like nature of light. Newton did not publish his analysis until after Hooke's death, as part of his treatise "Opticks" published in 1704.

== Theory ==
Arrangement to view Newton's Rings: a convex lens is placed on top of a flat surface.

The pattern is created by placing a very slightly convex curved glass on an optical flat glass. The two pieces of glass make contact only at the center. At other points there is a slight air gap between the two surfaces, increasing with radial distance from the center.

Consider monochromatic (single color) light incident from the top that reflects from both the bottom surface of the top lens and the top surface of the optical flat below it. The light passes through the glass lens until it comes to the glass-to-air boundary, where the transmitted light goes from a higher refractive index (n) value to a lower n value. The transmitted light passes through this boundary with no phase change. The reflected light undergoing internal reflection (about 4% of the total) also has no phase change. The light that is transmitted into the air travels a distance, t, before it is reflected at the flat surface below. Reflection at this air-to-glass boundary causes a half-cycle (180°) phase shift because the air has a lower refractive index than the glass. The reflected light at the lower surface returns a distance of (again) t and passes back into the lens. The additional path length is equal to twice the gap between the surfaces. The two reflected rays will interfere according to the total phase change caused by the extra path length 2t and by the half-cycle phase change induced in reflection at the flat surface. When the distance 2t is zero (lens touching optical flat) the waves interfere destructively, hence the central region of the pattern is dark.

A similar analysis for illumination of the device from below instead of from above shows that in this case the central portion of the pattern is bright, not dark. When the light is not monochromatic, the radial position of the fringe pattern has a "rainbow" appearance.

=== Interference ===
Closeup of a section of the top glass on the optical flat, showing how interference fringes form. At positions where the path length difference is equal to an odd multiple (2n + 1) of a half-wavelength (a), the reflected waves reinforce, resulting in a bright spot. At positions where the path length difference is equal to an even multiple (2n) of a half-wavelength (b), (Lambda by 2) the reflected waves cancel, resulting in a dark spot. This results in a pattern of concentric bright and dark rings, interference fringes.

In areas where the path length difference between the two rays is equal to an odd multiple of half a wavelength (λ/2) of the light waves, the reflected waves will be in phase, so the "troughs" and "peaks" of the waves coincide. Therefore, the waves will reinforce (add) through constructive interference and the resulting reflected light intensity will be greater. As a result, a bright area will be observed there.

At other locations, where the path length difference is equal to an even multiple of a half-wavelength, the reflected waves will be 180° out of phase, so a "trough" of one wave coincides with a "peak" of the other wave. This is destructive interference: the waves will cancel (subtract) and the resulting light intensity will be weaker or zero. As a result, a dark area will be observed there. Because of the 180° phase reversal due to reflection of the bottom ray, the center where the two pieces touch is dark.

This interference results in a pattern of bright and dark lines or bands called "interference fringes" being observed on the surface. These are similar to contour lines on maps, revealing differences in the thickness of the air gap. The gap between the surfaces is constant along a fringe. The path length difference between two adjacent bright or dark fringes is one wavelength λ of the light, so the difference in the gap between the surfaces is one-half wavelength. Since the wavelength of light is so small, this technique can measure very small departures from flatness. For example, the wavelength of red light is about 700 nm, so using red light the difference in height between two fringes is half that, or 350 nm, about 1/100 the diameter of a human hair. Since the gap between the glasses increases radially from the center, the interference fringes form concentric rings. For glass surfaces that are not axially symmetric, the fringes will not be rings but will have other shapes.

=== Quantitative Relationships ===
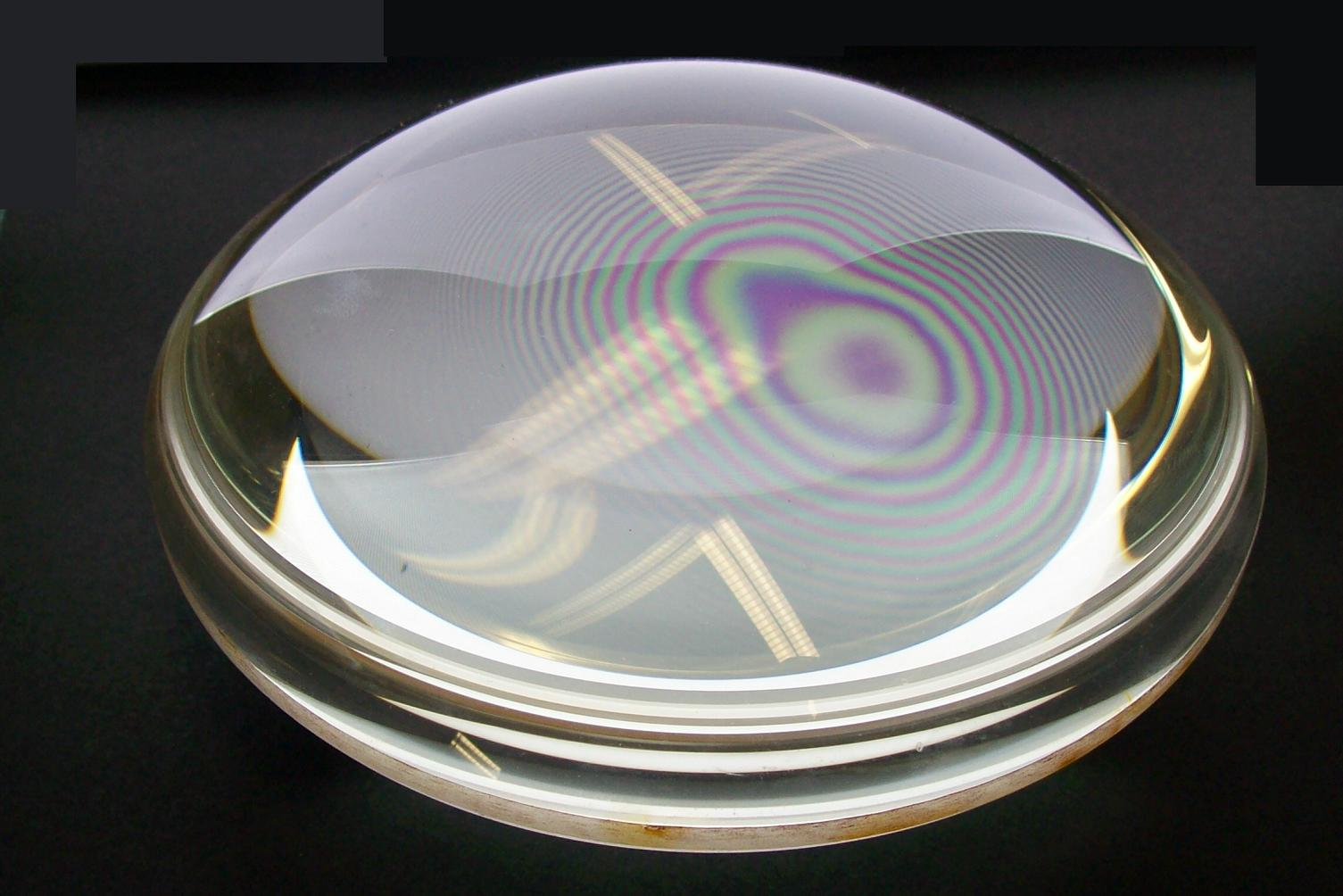
Newton's rings seen in two plano-convex lenses with their flat surfaces in contact. One surface is slightly convex, creating the rings. In white light, the rings are rainbow-colored, because the different wavelengths of each color interfere at different locations.

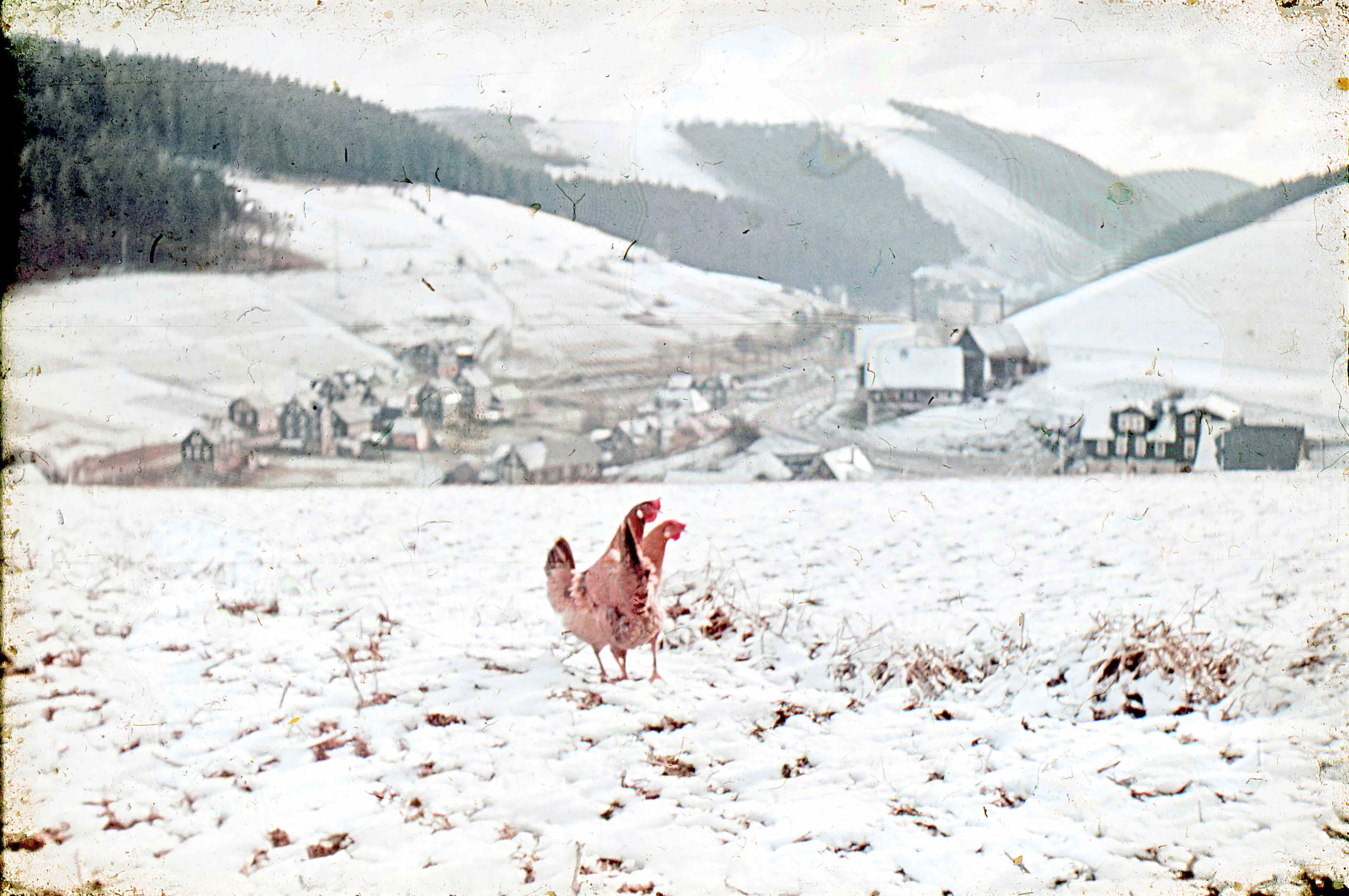
Rainbow-colored Newton's rings on an Agfacolor slide (slightly right of center on the houses and upper right on the mountains).

For illumination from above, with a dark center, the radius of the N^{th} bright ring is given by
$$r_N= \left[\lambda R \left(N - {1 \over 2}\right)\right]^{1/2},$$
where N is the bright-ring number, R is the radius of curvature of the glass lens the light is passing through, and λ is the wavelength of the light. The above formula is also applicable for dark rings for the ring pattern obtained by transmitted light.

Given the radial distance of a bright ring, r, and a radius of curvature of the lens, R, the air gap between the glass surfaces, t, is given to a good approximation by

$$t = {r^2 \over 2R},$$

where the effect of viewing the pattern at an angle oblique to the incident rays is ignored.

=== Thin-film interference ===
The phenomenon of Newton's rings is explained on the same basis as thin-film interference, including effects such as "rainbows" seen in thin films of oil on water or in soap bubbles. The difference is that here the "thin film" is a thin layer of air.
