= Gauge (instrument) =

Device used to make and display dimensional measurements

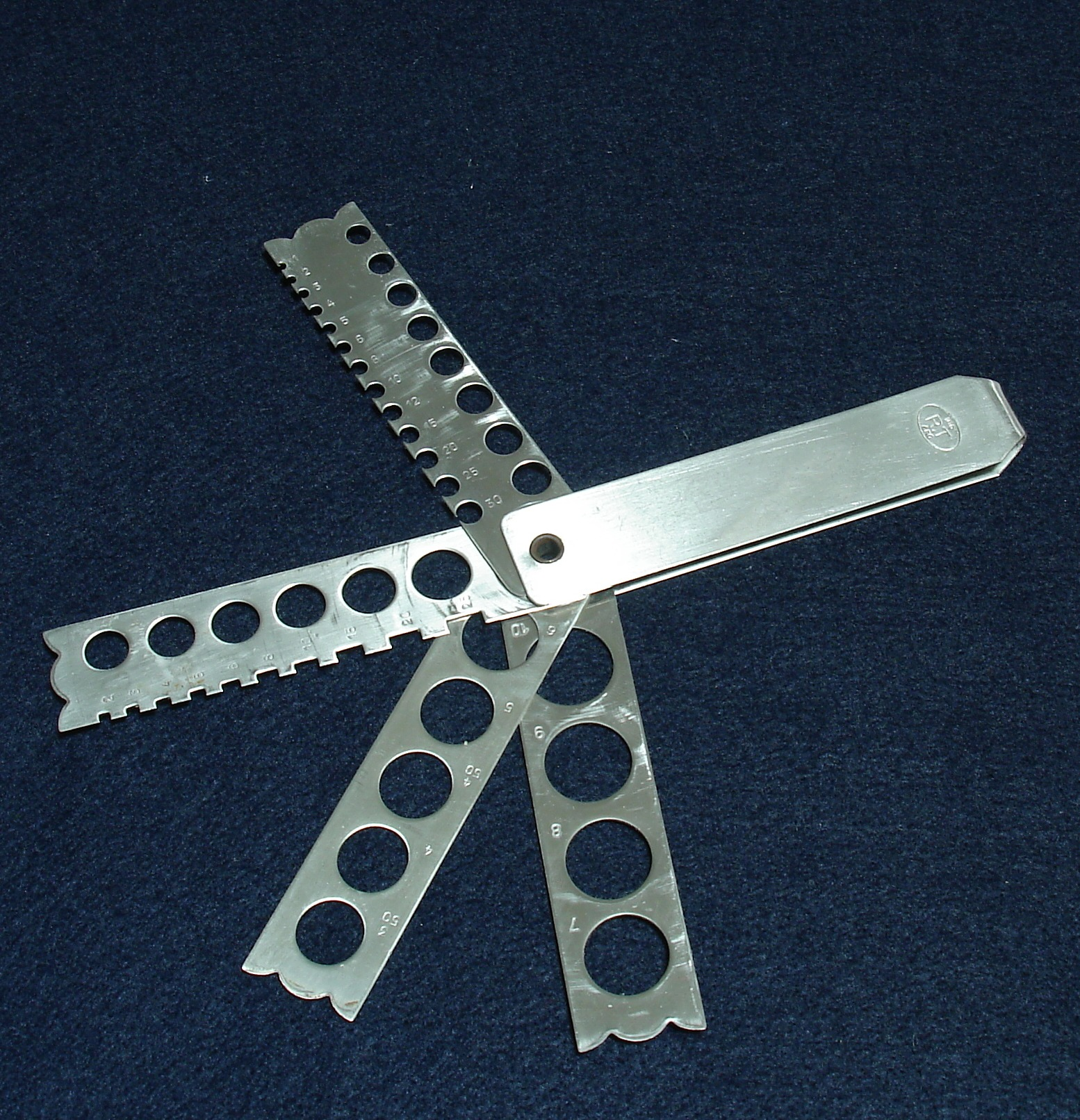
Diamond gauge

In science and engineering, a dimensional gauge or simply gauge (also spelled gage) is a device used to make measurements or to display certain dimensional information. A wide variety of tools exist which serve such functions, ranging from simple pieces of material against which sizes can be measured to complex pieces of machinery. Dimensional properties include thickness, gap in space, diameter of materials.

== Basic types ==
All gauges can be divided into four main types, independent of their actual use.

1. Analogue instrument meter with analogue display ("needles"). Until the later decades the most common basic type.
2. Digital instrument meter with analogue display. A screen that shows an "analogue meter", commonly used in modern aircraft cockpits, and some hospital equipment etc.
3. Digital instrument meter with digital display. Only numbers are shown on a digital display.
4. Analogue instrument meter with digital display. Only numbers are displayed, but through a mechanical or electro-mechanical display (today very rare but has existed for clocks, certain Doppler meters and informational screens at many stations and airports)

The two basic types with an analogue display are usually easier for the human eyes and brain to interpret, especially if many instrument meters must be read simultaneously. An indicator or needle indicates the measurement on the gauge. The other two types are only displaying digits, which are more complex for humans to read and interpret. The ultimate example is cockpit instrumentation in aircraft. The flight instruments cannot display figures only, hence even in the most modern "glass-cockpits" where almost all instruments are displayed at screens, few figures are visible. Instead the screens display analogue meters.

== Types ==
Various types of dimensional gauges include:

| Name | Description |
|---|---|
| Bore gauge | a device used for measuring holes. |
| Hole gauge | used to gage internal dimensions of bores that are either too small in diameter for an inside micrometer, and have greater economy than a bore gage or other precision internal gage. |
| Caliper | a device used to measure the distance between two opposing sides of an object. |
| Center gauges and fishtail gauges | are engineering gauges used in lathe work for checking the angles when grinding the profiles of single-point screw-cutting tool bits and centers; coaxical centering gauges are used to center a rotary table against a drilling bit in drilling mills |
| Clock | an instrument for measuring, keeping or indicating time |
| Comb type gage | a ruler-shaped gage with two supports at each of its six sides, having tabs of varying lengths. For measuring the comb gage is pushed perpendicular into the film using the measuring range that corresponds to the expected film thickness. The wet film thickness will fall between the clearance of the shortest tab that is wet and the clearance of the next shortest dry tab. |
| Dial indicator, also known as a dial test indicator, dial gauge, or probe indicator | an instrument used to accurately measure small linear distances. |
| Feeler gauge | a simple tool used to measure gap widths. |
| Gauge block, (also known as a gage block, Johansson gauge, slip gauge, or Jo block) | a precision ground and lapped length measuring standard. It is used as a reference for the setting of measuring equipment used in machine shops, such as micrometers, sine bars, calipers, and dial indicators (when used in an inspection role). |
| Gauge pin is similar to a gauge block. It is a precision ground cylindrical bar for use in Go/no go gauges or similar applications. | |
| Go/no go gauge | an inspection tool used to check a workpiece against its allowed tolerances. Its name derives from its use: the gauge has two tests; the check involves the workpiece having to pass one test (Go) and fail the other (No Go). |
| Grind gage | a flat steel block in the surface of which are two flat-bottomed grooves varying uniformly in depth from a maximum at one end of the block to zero near the other end. Groove depth is graduated on the block according to one or more scales used for measuring particle size. Most gages will have one scale marked in either mils or micrometers. |
| Load cell | a transducer that is used to convert a force into electrical signal. This conversion is indirect and happens in two stages. Through a mechanical arrangement, the force being sensed deforms a strain gauge. The strain gauge converts the deformation (strain) to electrical signals. A load cell usually consists of four strain gauges in a Wheatstone bridge configuration. Load cells of one strain gauge (quarter bridge) or two strain gauges (half bridge) are also available. The electrical signal output is typically in the order of a few millivolts and requires amplification by an instrumentation amplifier before it can be used. The output of the transducer is plugged into an algorithm to calculate the force applied to the transducer. |
| The linear variable differential transformer (LVDT) | a type of electrical transformer used for measuring linear displacement. The transformer has three solenoidal coils placed end-to-end around a tube. The center coil is the primary, and the two outer coils are the secondaries. A cylindrical ferromagnetic core, attached to the object whose position is to be measured, slides along the axis of the tube. |
| micrometer, sometimes known as a "micrometer screw gauge" | a device incorporating a calibrated screw used widely for precise measurement of small distances in mechanical engineering and machining as well as most mechanical trades, along with other metrological instruments such as dial, vernier, and digital calipers. Micrometers are often, but not always, in the form of calipers. |
| Profile gauge or contour gauge | a tool for recording the cross-sectional shape of a surface. |
| Radius gauge, also known as a fillet gauge | a tool used to measure the radius of an object. Radius gauges require a bright light behind the object to be measured. The gauge is placed against the edge to be checked and any light leakage between the blade and edge indicates a mismatch that requires correction. Some flat radius gauges combine curved profiles for checking radii with diameter and length scales. |
| Ring gauge | a cylindrical ring of steel whose inside diameter is finished to gauge tolerance and is used for checking the external diameter of a cylindrical object. |
| Strain gauge | a device used to measure the strain of an object. |
| Taper gauge | a graduated, wedge-shaped tool used to measure gap widths and hole diameters by inserting it into an opening and reading the scale. When measuring circular holes, a correction may be needed to account for the gauge's thickness. |
| Thread pitch gauge, also called a threading gauge, pitch gauge, or screw gauge | a device used to measure the pitch or lead of screw threads. |
| Vernier height gauge | a measuring device used either for determining the height of something, or for repetitious marking of items to be worked on. The former type of height gauge is often used in doctor's surgeries to find the height of people. |
| Wire gauge | measuring tool determines the thickness of a wire. |

Examples of dimensional gauges

A radius scale combining radius, diameter and length measurement functions

A tapered gauge for measuring gaps and hole diameters

== See also ==
- Dimensional instruments
- Geometric dimensioning and tolerancing
