= Snap gauge =

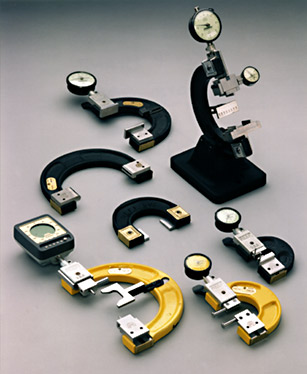
Snap go/no go gauge and indicator snap gauge

A snap gauge is a form of go/no go gauge. It is a limit gauge with permanently or temporarily fixed measurement aperture(s) (gaps) which is used to quickly verify whether an outside dimension of a part matches a preset dimension or falls within predefined tolerances.

== Details ==
The surfaces which define the edges of the aperture are the anvils, which may be made of separate pieces of hard material such as tungsten carbide for wear resistance. Two apertures are frequently used to provide Go/No-Go testing and are often arranged such that a part being measured can pass through the two apertures in sequence; a part that is within tolerance will pass through the first maximum size limit aperture but will not be able to pass through the minimum size limit aperture. A snap gauge usually has a C-shaped frame with the aperture(s) at the opening of the "C". Snap gauges may be machined and ground out of a single block of metal or adjustable snap gauges, which have movable anvils that may be adjusted over a limited range of sizes, may be used. They may also be of built up construction in which one or more gauge blocks or feeler gauges are sandwiched between two anvils. Adjustable snap gauges may be reset to compensate for wear or re-tasked for measuring a different dimension and can be purchased off the shelf and set rather than needing to be fabricated from scratch when a new gauge is needed. Gauge blocks would typically be used to initially set the width of the measuring aperture(s).

A variation is the snap indicator gauge, which incorporates a dial indicator or electronic digital indicator as one of the anvils. This indicator displays the deviation from the preset dimension and the indicator may have high and low tolerance limits marked by means of two extra needles, alteration of the dial face, or programming into an electronic indicator. Another variation adds, in addition to the dial or electronic indicator, a micrometer adjustment on the anvil opposite the indicator anvil. This may be referred to as a snap gauge or an indicating micrometer and may be quickly preset for short runs of parts.

Snap gauges facilitate making interchangeable parts. Snap gauges have been in existence and referred to by that name since at least 1898. In a manufacturing plant, snap gauges would normally be re-calibrated at scheduled intervals. Often, snap gauges will be calibrated by skilled workers and used by semi-skilled workers; the snap gauge is faster than a micrometer and requires less skill to use correctly.

Some vendors who resell a different measuring instrument, bore gauge, muddy the waters by referring to them as snap gauges, unlike the manufacturer who uses the correct nomenclature. Unlike a snap gauge, these measure inside (bore) dimensions, not outside dimensions, and are usually reset for each part measured.
