= Center gauge =

Gauges used in lathe work to check angles

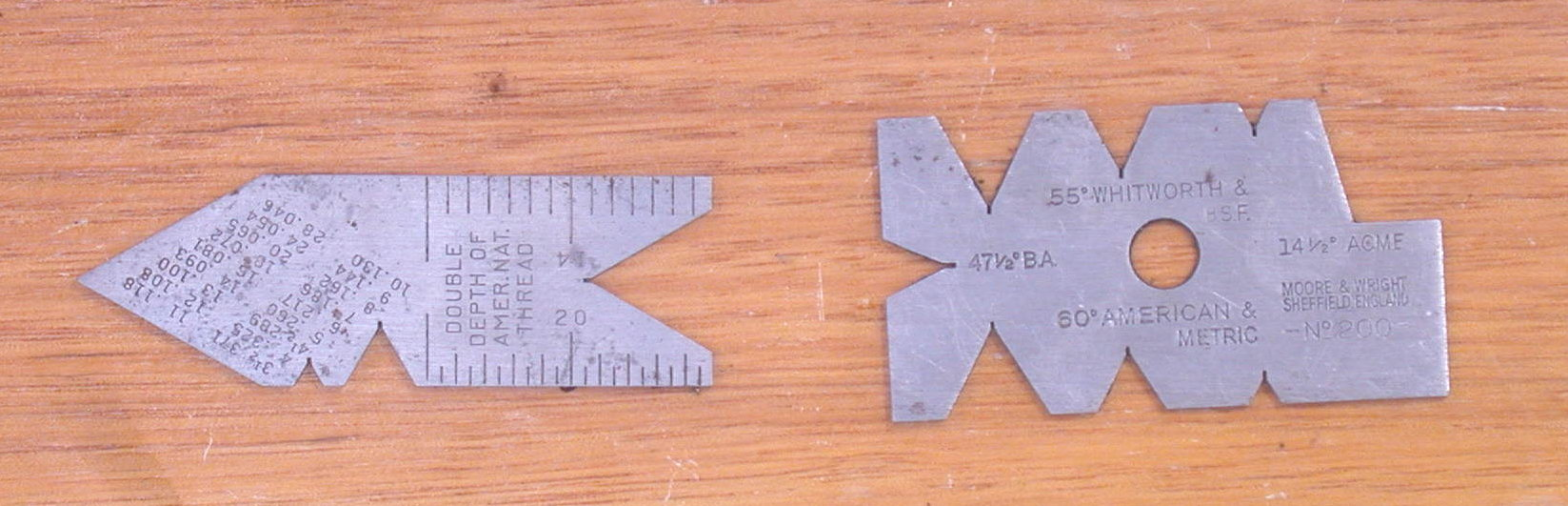
Two different thread setting gauges

Center gauges and fishtail gauges are gauges used in lathe work for checking the angles when grinding the profiles of single-point screw-cutting tool bits and centers. In the image, the gauge on the left is called a fishtail gauge or center gauge, and the one on the right is another style of center gauge.

These gauges are most commonly used when hand-grinding threading tool bits on a bench grinder, although they may be used with tool and cutter grinders. When the tool bit has been ground to the correct angle, they are then used to set the tool perpendicular to the workpiece.

They can incorporate a range of sizes and types on the one gauge, the two most common being metric or UNC and UNF at 60°, and BSW at 55°. Gauges also exist for the Acme thread form.
