= Pottery gauge =

Tool in pottery

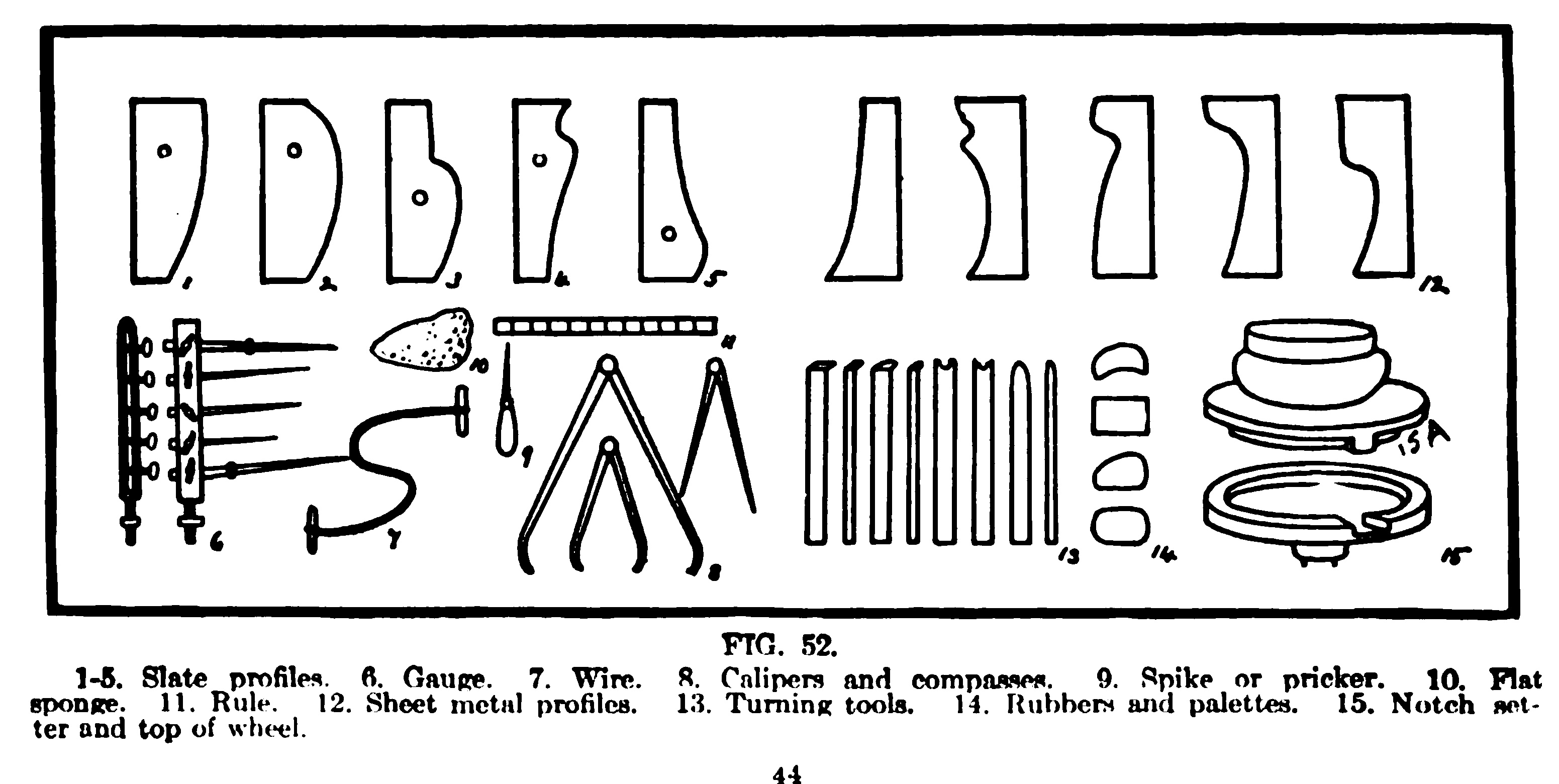
A diagram of studio pottery tools for turning and shaping, including a pottery gauge (labeled as 6 in the figure), from Frederick Hurten Rhead's self-illustrated 1910 book, Studio Pottery.

In archaeology, a pottery gauge is a profile gauge used for pots.

A pottery gauge is one of various tools used in pottery to ensure that pots thrown on a potter's wheel are uniform in size or shape. Some pottery gauges simply ensure that the height and diameter are consistent, others are templates or shapers.
