= Profile gauge =

Tool for recording the cross-sectional shape of a surface

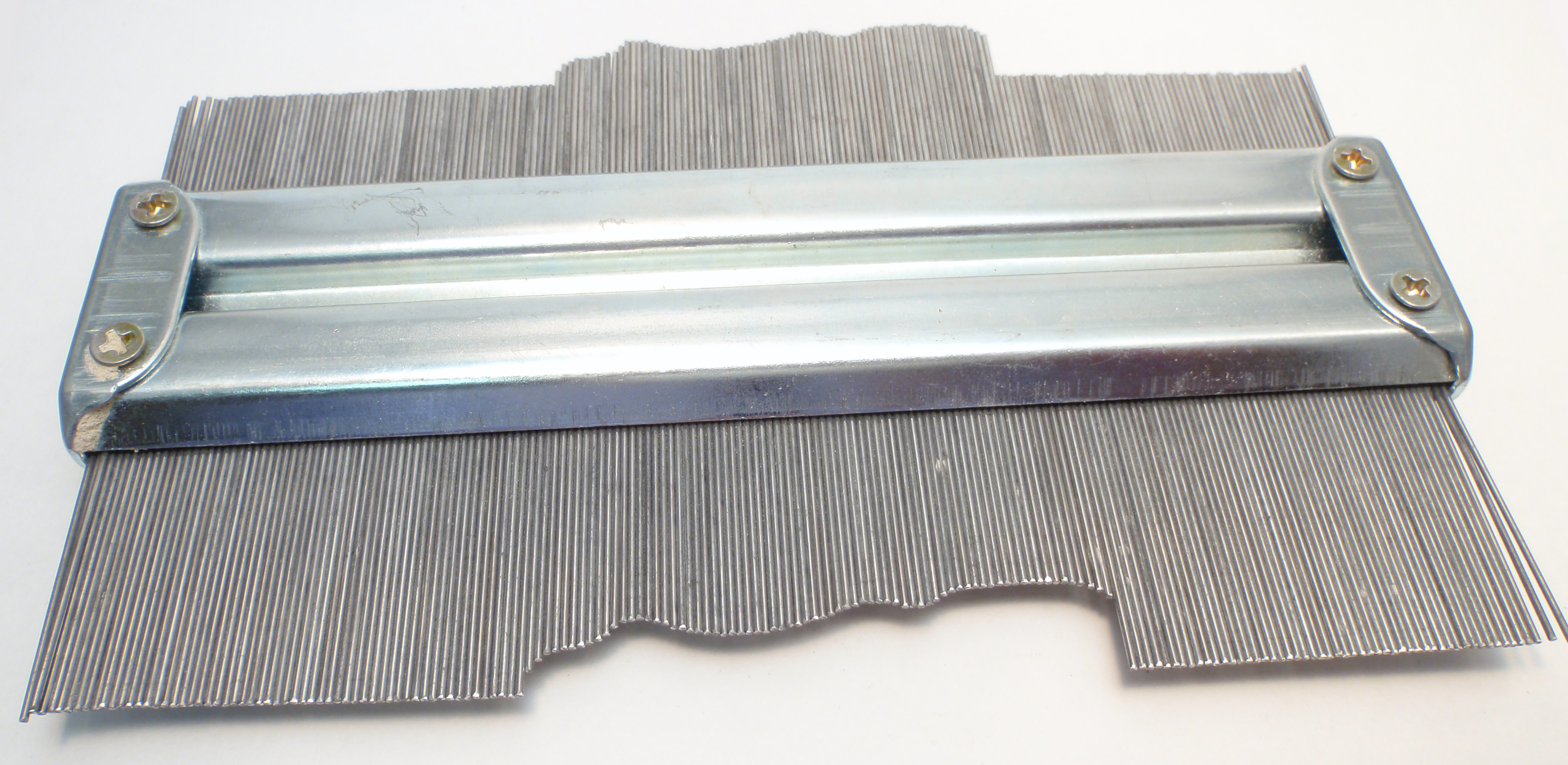
- A typical profile gauge used for surface measurement
- Other names: Contour gauge
- Uses: Surface profiling, roughness measurement, contour replication
- Related: Stylus profilometer, optical profilometer, laser scanning microscope

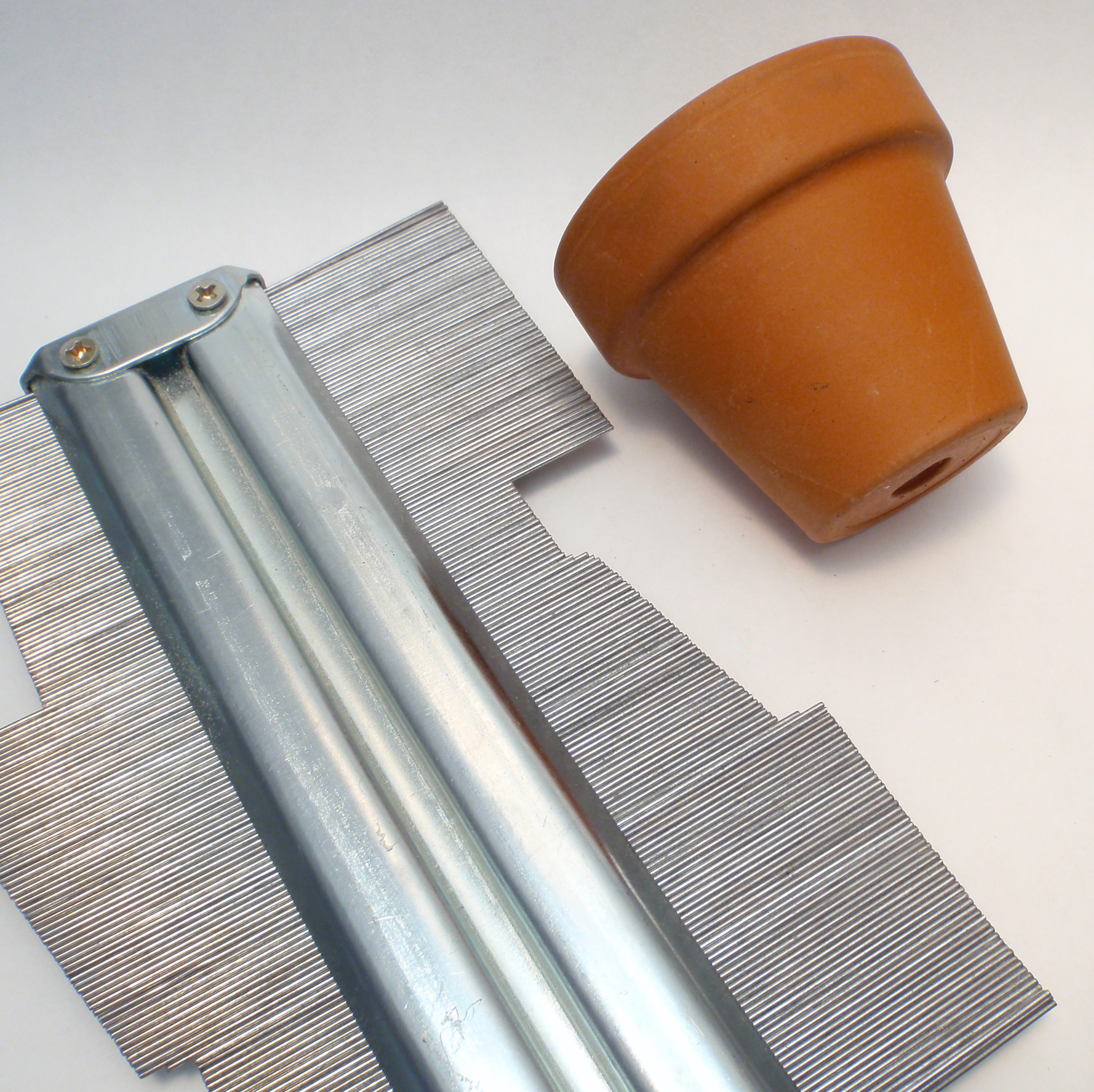
A contour gauge set to the profile of a small pot

A profile gauge or contour gauge is a tool for recording the cross-sectional shape of a surface. Contour gauges consist of a set of steel or plastic pins that are set tightly against one another in a frame which keeps them in the same plane and parallel while allowing them to move independently, perpendicularly to the frame. When pressed against an object, the pins conform to the object. The gauge can then be used to draw the profile or to copy it on to another surface.

== Applications ==
Profile gauges are used widely in metalworking and woodworking. In architectural conservation, they are used to document the profiles of decorative moldings. In archaeological illustration, they are typically used to record the profile of pots, and are thus named pottery gauges; but in ceramics, a pottery gauge is a template used in making pots.
