= Thread pitch gauge =

Gauge for measuring screw thread pitch or lead

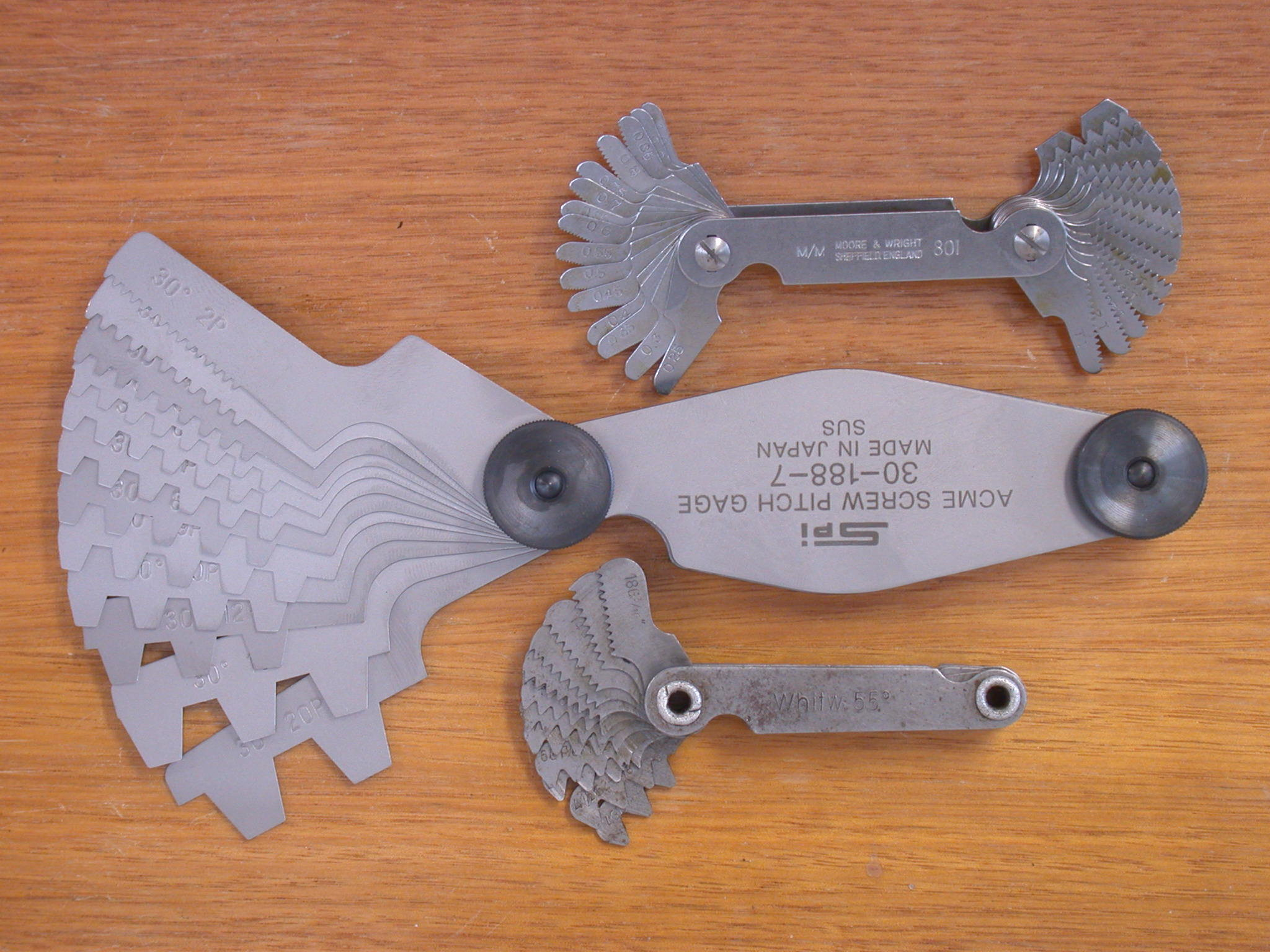
Three different sets of threading gauges. The uppermost gauge is an ISO metric pitch gauge, the larger gauge in the center is for measuring the Acme thread form, and the lower gauge is for Whitworth screws.

A thread gauge, also known as a screw gauge or pitch gauge, is used to measure the pitch or lead of a screw thread.

Thread pitch gauges are used as a reference tool in determining the pitch of a thread that is on a screw or in a tapped hole. This tool is not used as a precision measuring instrument, rather it allows the user to determine the profile of the given thread and quickly categorize the thread by shape and pitch. This device also saves time, in that it removes the need for the user to measure and calculate the pitch of the threaded item.

== Usage ==
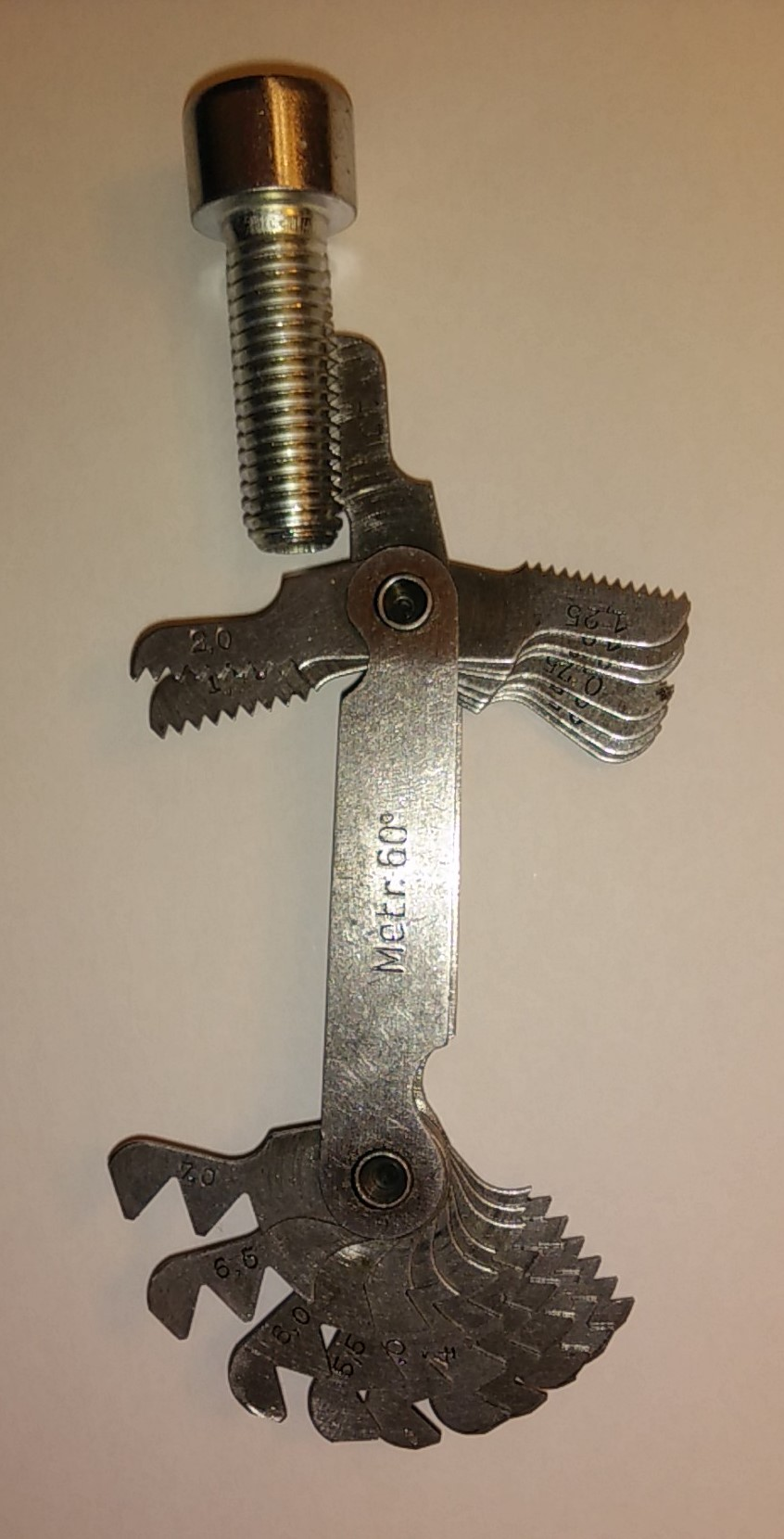
Usage of a thread pitch gauge

To use a thread gauge, the user must first match the type of thread to the gauge. For example, attempting to measure metric threads with an imperial gauge will not return accurate results. To determine the correct gauge, a process of trial and error may be needed if the screw is of unknown origin.

Once the correct gauge is determined, the user should extend one of the leaves of the tool and press it against the threaded portion of a screw. If the teeth (cut into the leaf) match the spacing of the thread, then the user can read off the thread pitch stamped into the leaf. If the fit is not good, the user should try a different leaf.

Note that this tool is not for accurate measurement of an unknown thread, such as a hand-turned thread from a lathe. This tool is meant for a best-approximation measurement to a known thread standard.

== See also ==
- Thread angle
- Thread pitch
- Radius gauge
