= Radius gauge =

Tool used to measure the radius of an object

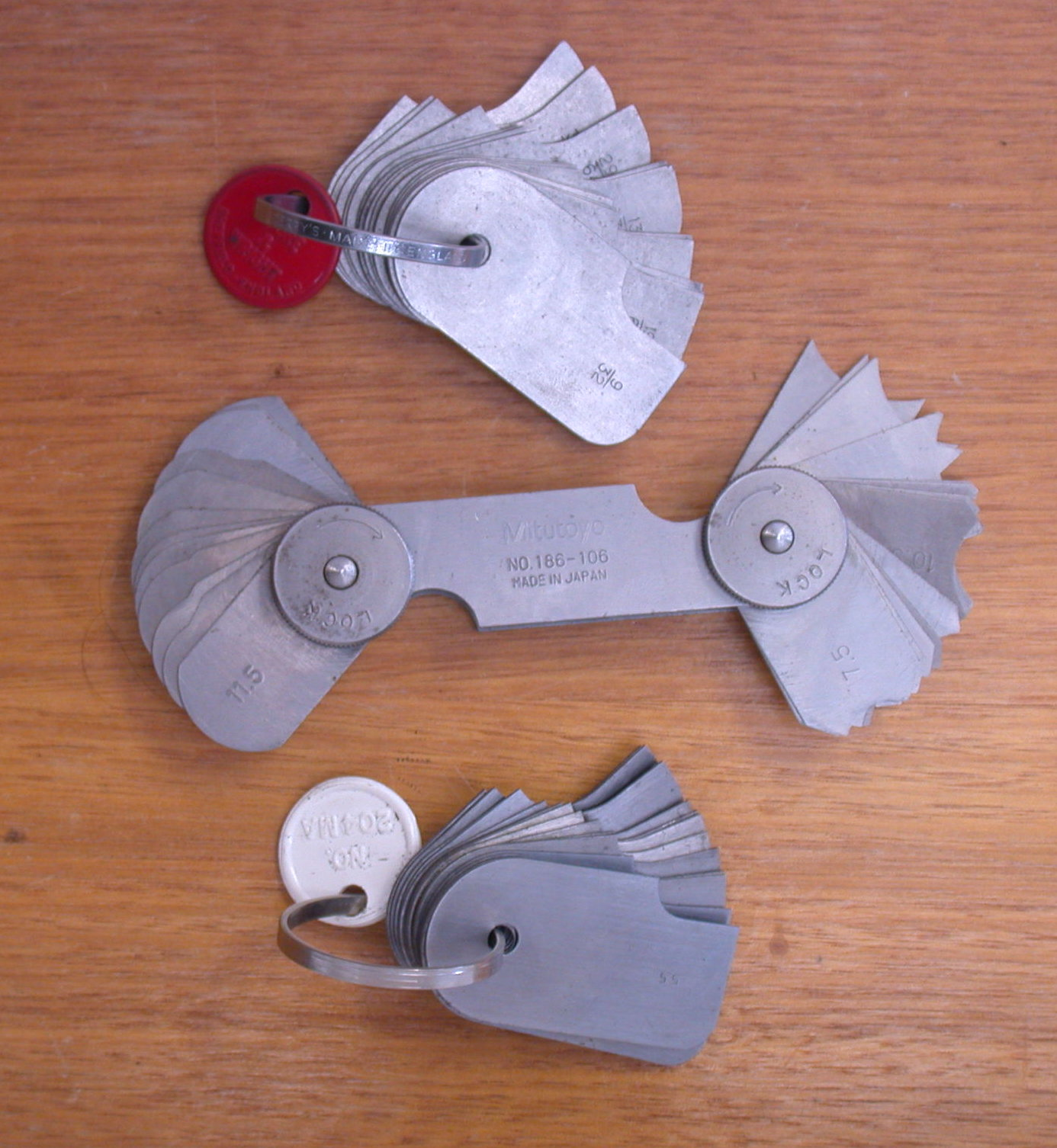
Two types of radius gauges

Shinwa Radius Scale, a stainless-steel measuring tool combining a radius gauge (R0.5–7 mm), a diameter gauge, and a 150 mm ruler.

A radius gauge, also known as a fillet gauge, is a tool used to measure the radius of an object.

Radius gauges require a bright light behind the object to be measured. The gauge is placed against the edge to be checked and any light leakage between the blade and edge indicates a mismatch that requires correction.

Sets typically include both convex and concave sections shaped to fit into confined or hard-to-reach locations.

Every leaf has a different radius, for example with radius intervals of 0.25 mm or 0.5 mm. The material of the leaves is stainless steel. Each gauge is one of two types; either internal or external, which are used to check the radius of inner and outer surfaces, respectively.

== See also ==
- Thread pitch gauge
- Spherometer, an instrument for the precise measurement of radiuses
