= Feeler gauge =

Tool used to measure gap widths

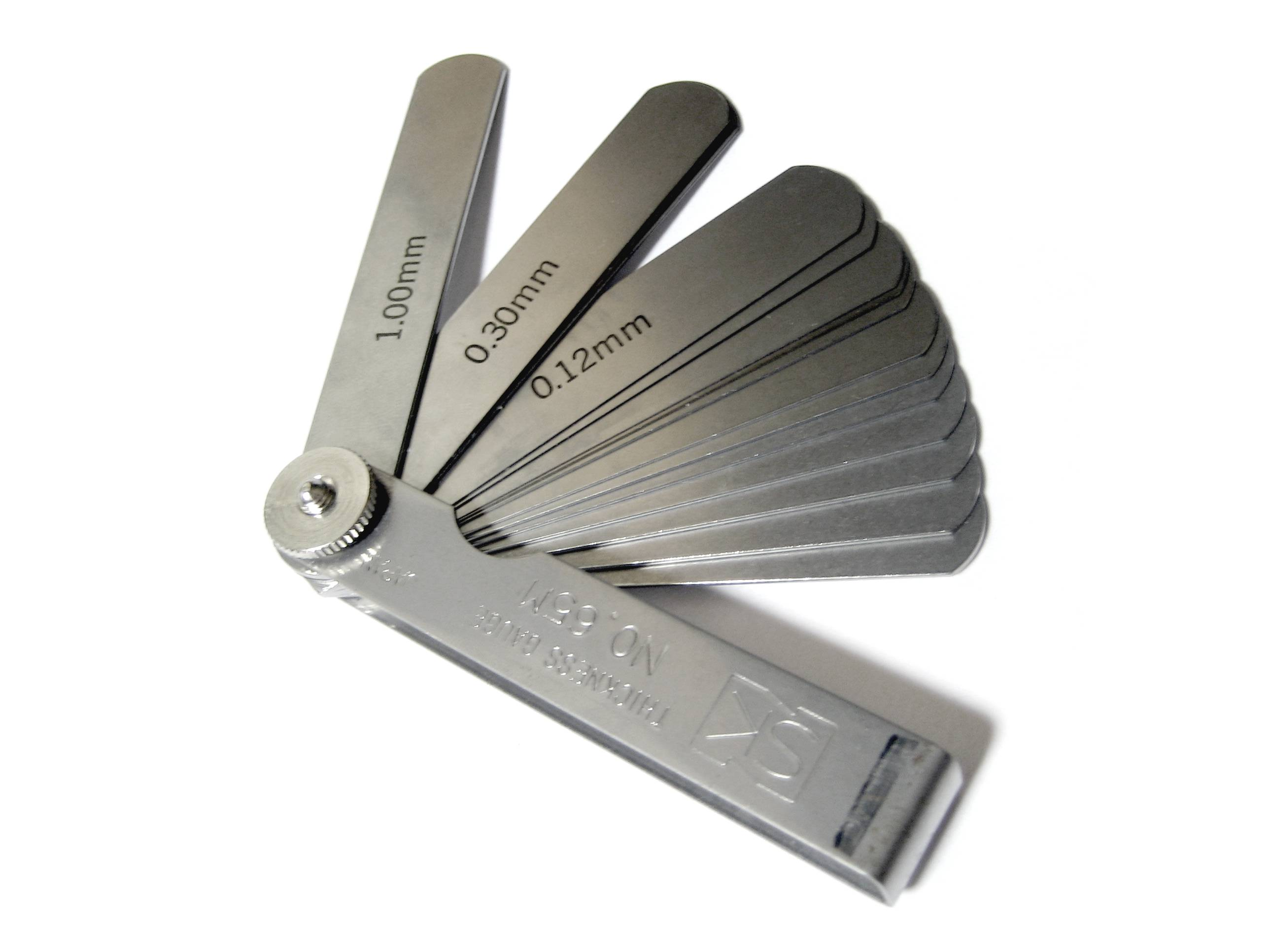
Feeler gauge set (25 pieces, 0.03~1.0 mm measurement range)

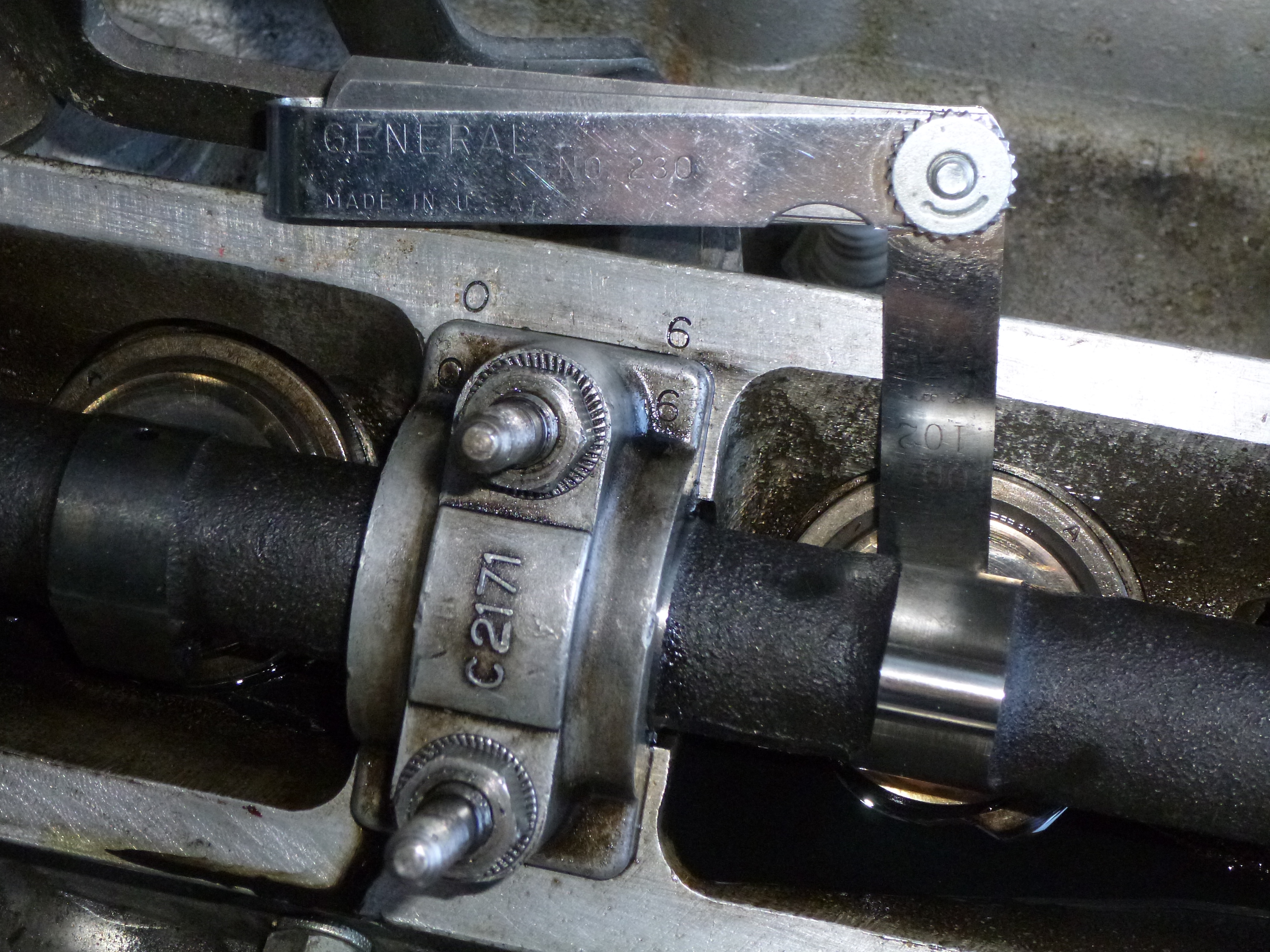
Measuring the valve clearance of a DOHC engine, between camshaft and tappet (here: 0.004 in ≈ 0.10 mm).

A feeler gauge is a tool used to measure gap widths. Feeler gauges are mostly used in engineering to measure the clearance between two parts.

== Description ==
They consist of a number of small lengths of steel of different thicknesses with measurements marked on each piece. They are flexible enough that, even if they are all on the same hinge, several can be stacked together to gauge intermediate values. It is common to have two sets: one for imperial units (typically measured in thousandths of an inch), and one for metric (typically measured in hundredths of a millimetre) measurements (with intervals of thousandths of an inch and hundredths of a millimetre being roughly in the same order of magnitude).

The same device with wires of specific diameter instead of flat blades is used to set the gap in spark plugs to the correct size; this is done by increasing or decreasing the gap until the gauge of the correct size just fits inside the gap.

The lengths of steel are sometimes called leaves or blades, although they have no sharp edge.

Stainless steel is a common material for feeler gauges. Some feeler gauge sets have a single blade of brass due to the historical reason that early electronic ignition systems required the air gap between the reluctor and the pickup part being set with a non-ferrous metal.

== Types ==
=== Taper ===
Tapered (upper) and parallel (lower) feeler gauges

A taper feeler gauge is a feeler gauge of tapered, as opposed to parallel, shape. The blade of the gauge is of a constant thickness, and the two types of gauge are used in a similar way.

== See also ==
- Go/no-go gauge – Inspection tool
- Plastigauge
